

243001–243100 

|-bgcolor=#E9E9E9
| 243001 ||  || — || October 1, 2006 || Apache Point || A. C. Becker || — || align=right | 3.2 km || 
|-id=002 bgcolor=#d6d6d6
| 243002 Lemmy ||  ||  || October 11, 2006 || Apache Point || A. C. Becker || — || align=right | 2.4 km || 
|-id=003 bgcolor=#d6d6d6
| 243003 ||  || — || October 12, 2006 || Apache Point || A. C. Becker || — || align=right | 4.8 km || 
|-id=004 bgcolor=#d6d6d6
| 243004 ||  || — || October 16, 2006 || Catalina || CSS || HYG || align=right | 3.8 km || 
|-id=005 bgcolor=#d6d6d6
| 243005 ||  || — || October 16, 2006 || Catalina || CSS || TELfast? || align=right | 2.0 km || 
|-id=006 bgcolor=#d6d6d6
| 243006 ||  || — || October 16, 2006 || Kitt Peak || Spacewatch || ELF || align=right | 4.9 km || 
|-id=007 bgcolor=#E9E9E9
| 243007 ||  || — || October 19, 2006 || Kitt Peak || Spacewatch || AST || align=right | 2.8 km || 
|-id=008 bgcolor=#d6d6d6
| 243008 ||  || — || October 16, 2006 || Catalina || CSS || — || align=right | 4.4 km || 
|-id=009 bgcolor=#d6d6d6
| 243009 ||  || — || October 17, 2006 || Kitt Peak || Spacewatch || EOS || align=right | 2.3 km || 
|-id=010 bgcolor=#d6d6d6
| 243010 ||  || — || October 17, 2006 || Mount Lemmon || Mount Lemmon Survey || — || align=right | 4.9 km || 
|-id=011 bgcolor=#E9E9E9
| 243011 ||  || — || October 18, 2006 || Kitt Peak || Spacewatch || — || align=right | 2.2 km || 
|-id=012 bgcolor=#E9E9E9
| 243012 ||  || — || October 19, 2006 || Mount Lemmon || Mount Lemmon Survey || — || align=right | 4.6 km || 
|-id=013 bgcolor=#E9E9E9
| 243013 ||  || — || October 21, 2006 || Mount Lemmon || Mount Lemmon Survey || — || align=right | 2.7 km || 
|-id=014 bgcolor=#d6d6d6
| 243014 ||  || — || October 21, 2006 || Catalina || CSS || SYL7:4 || align=right | 7.1 km || 
|-id=015 bgcolor=#E9E9E9
| 243015 ||  || — || October 21, 2006 || Mount Lemmon || Mount Lemmon Survey || — || align=right | 2.7 km || 
|-id=016 bgcolor=#d6d6d6
| 243016 ||  || — || October 21, 2006 || Mount Lemmon || Mount Lemmon Survey || HYG || align=right | 4.6 km || 
|-id=017 bgcolor=#E9E9E9
| 243017 ||  || — || October 16, 2006 || Catalina || CSS || — || align=right | 2.6 km || 
|-id=018 bgcolor=#d6d6d6
| 243018 ||  || — || October 16, 2006 || Catalina || CSS || — || align=right | 3.2 km || 
|-id=019 bgcolor=#d6d6d6
| 243019 ||  || — || October 16, 2006 || Catalina || CSS || — || align=right | 5.2 km || 
|-id=020 bgcolor=#d6d6d6
| 243020 ||  || — || October 19, 2006 || Catalina || CSS || — || align=right | 5.0 km || 
|-id=021 bgcolor=#E9E9E9
| 243021 ||  || — || October 21, 2006 || Kitt Peak || Spacewatch || — || align=right | 1.7 km || 
|-id=022 bgcolor=#E9E9E9
| 243022 ||  || — || October 22, 2006 || Palomar || NEAT || — || align=right | 2.4 km || 
|-id=023 bgcolor=#d6d6d6
| 243023 ||  || — || October 23, 2006 || Kitt Peak || Spacewatch || 7:4 || align=right | 5.7 km || 
|-id=024 bgcolor=#E9E9E9
| 243024 ||  || — || October 23, 2006 || Palomar || NEAT || — || align=right | 3.1 km || 
|-id=025 bgcolor=#FFC2E0
| 243025 ||  || — || October 21, 2006 || Catalina || CSS || AMO +1km || align=right | 2.1 km || 
|-id=026 bgcolor=#E9E9E9
| 243026 ||  || — || October 19, 2006 || Mount Lemmon || Mount Lemmon Survey || — || align=right | 3.2 km || 
|-id=027 bgcolor=#E9E9E9
| 243027 ||  || — || October 20, 2006 || Palomar || NEAT || PAD || align=right | 3.3 km || 
|-id=028 bgcolor=#E9E9E9
| 243028 ||  || — || October 21, 2006 || Palomar || NEAT || — || align=right | 2.4 km || 
|-id=029 bgcolor=#E9E9E9
| 243029 ||  || — || October 28, 2006 || Catalina || CSS || MAR || align=right | 2.4 km || 
|-id=030 bgcolor=#d6d6d6
| 243030 ||  || — || October 27, 2006 || Kitt Peak || Spacewatch || EOS || align=right | 2.4 km || 
|-id=031 bgcolor=#d6d6d6
| 243031 ||  || — || October 19, 2006 || Kitt Peak || M. W. Buie || — || align=right | 2.6 km || 
|-id=032 bgcolor=#E9E9E9
| 243032 ||  || — || November 10, 2006 || Kitt Peak || Spacewatch || — || align=right | 3.1 km || 
|-id=033 bgcolor=#E9E9E9
| 243033 ||  || — || November 11, 2006 || Catalina || CSS || — || align=right | 2.1 km || 
|-id=034 bgcolor=#fefefe
| 243034 ||  || — || November 13, 2006 || Kitt Peak || Spacewatch || — || align=right | 2.7 km || 
|-id=035 bgcolor=#d6d6d6
| 243035 ||  || — || November 13, 2006 || San Marcello || Pistoia Mountains Obs. || TIR || align=right | 4.2 km || 
|-id=036 bgcolor=#E9E9E9
| 243036 ||  || — || November 11, 2006 || Kitt Peak || Spacewatch || PAD || align=right | 3.2 km || 
|-id=037 bgcolor=#E9E9E9
| 243037 ||  || — || November 15, 2006 || Mount Lemmon || Mount Lemmon Survey || — || align=right | 2.2 km || 
|-id=038 bgcolor=#E9E9E9
| 243038 ||  || — || November 16, 2006 || Socorro || LINEAR || — || align=right | 2.1 km || 
|-id=039 bgcolor=#d6d6d6
| 243039 ||  || — || November 17, 2006 || Catalina || CSS || — || align=right | 4.9 km || 
|-id=040 bgcolor=#d6d6d6
| 243040 ||  || — || November 16, 2006 || Mount Lemmon || Mount Lemmon Survey || — || align=right | 3.9 km || 
|-id=041 bgcolor=#E9E9E9
| 243041 ||  || — || November 21, 2006 || Mount Lemmon || Mount Lemmon Survey || KRM || align=right | 4.1 km || 
|-id=042 bgcolor=#E9E9E9
| 243042 ||  || — || November 19, 2006 || Catalina || CSS || — || align=right | 3.2 km || 
|-id=043 bgcolor=#E9E9E9
| 243043 ||  || — || November 17, 2006 || Mount Lemmon || Mount Lemmon Survey || HOF || align=right | 4.1 km || 
|-id=044 bgcolor=#d6d6d6
| 243044 ||  || — || December 12, 2006 || Kitt Peak || Spacewatch || — || align=right | 5.9 km || 
|-id=045 bgcolor=#d6d6d6
| 243045 ||  || — || December 11, 2006 || Kitt Peak || Spacewatch || 7:4 || align=right | 5.6 km || 
|-id=046 bgcolor=#d6d6d6
| 243046 ||  || — || December 12, 2006 || Mount Lemmon || Mount Lemmon Survey || — || align=right | 3.5 km || 
|-id=047 bgcolor=#d6d6d6
| 243047 ||  || — || December 15, 2006 || Mount Lemmon || Mount Lemmon Survey || — || align=right | 4.0 km || 
|-id=048 bgcolor=#d6d6d6
| 243048 ||  || — || December 19, 2006 || Purple Mountain || PMO NEO || LIX || align=right | 6.1 km || 
|-id=049 bgcolor=#d6d6d6
| 243049 ||  || — || January 17, 2007 || Catalina || CSS || — || align=right | 7.0 km || 
|-id=050 bgcolor=#d6d6d6
| 243050 ||  || — || January 16, 2007 || Mount Lemmon || Mount Lemmon Survey || 7:4 || align=right | 4.2 km || 
|-id=051 bgcolor=#fefefe
| 243051 ||  || — || January 27, 2007 || Mount Lemmon || Mount Lemmon Survey || — || align=right | 1.6 km || 
|-id=052 bgcolor=#fefefe
| 243052 ||  || — || January 24, 2007 || Catalina || CSS || H || align=right data-sort-value="0.75" | 750 m || 
|-id=053 bgcolor=#fefefe
| 243053 ||  || — || February 13, 2007 || Socorro || LINEAR || H || align=right data-sort-value="0.77" | 770 m || 
|-id=054 bgcolor=#E9E9E9
| 243054 ||  || — || February 13, 2007 || Socorro || LINEAR || — || align=right | 5.4 km || 
|-id=055 bgcolor=#E9E9E9
| 243055 ||  || — || February 17, 2007 || Kitt Peak || Spacewatch || — || align=right | 3.1 km || 
|-id=056 bgcolor=#E9E9E9
| 243056 ||  || — || February 17, 2007 || Kitt Peak || Spacewatch || NEM || align=right | 3.1 km || 
|-id=057 bgcolor=#d6d6d6
| 243057 ||  || — || February 17, 2007 || Kitt Peak || Spacewatch || TRP || align=right | 4.5 km || 
|-id=058 bgcolor=#d6d6d6
| 243058 ||  || — || March 10, 2007 || Mount Lemmon || Mount Lemmon Survey || — || align=right | 4.5 km || 
|-id=059 bgcolor=#E9E9E9
| 243059 ||  || — || March 11, 2007 || Mount Lemmon || Mount Lemmon Survey || AST || align=right | 3.1 km || 
|-id=060 bgcolor=#fefefe
| 243060 ||  || — || March 15, 2007 || Socorro || LINEAR || H || align=right data-sort-value="0.74" | 740 m || 
|-id=061 bgcolor=#E9E9E9
| 243061 ||  || — || March 14, 2007 || Kitt Peak || Spacewatch || HOF || align=right | 2.8 km || 
|-id=062 bgcolor=#E9E9E9
| 243062 ||  || — || March 14, 2007 || Kitt Peak || Spacewatch || AST || align=right | 2.6 km || 
|-id=063 bgcolor=#E9E9E9
| 243063 ||  || — || March 13, 2007 || Mount Lemmon || Mount Lemmon Survey || KON || align=right | 3.3 km || 
|-id=064 bgcolor=#d6d6d6
| 243064 ||  || — || March 26, 2007 || Mount Lemmon || Mount Lemmon Survey || EOS || align=right | 3.3 km || 
|-id=065 bgcolor=#E9E9E9
| 243065 ||  || — || April 9, 2007 || Črni Vrh || Črni Vrh || — || align=right | 3.8 km || 
|-id=066 bgcolor=#d6d6d6
| 243066 ||  || — || April 11, 2007 || Kitt Peak || Spacewatch || — || align=right | 5.3 km || 
|-id=067 bgcolor=#d6d6d6
| 243067 ||  || — || April 13, 2007 || Siding Spring || SSS || EUP || align=right | 5.9 km || 
|-id=068 bgcolor=#E9E9E9
| 243068 ||  || — || April 14, 2007 || Kitt Peak || Spacewatch || — || align=right | 3.1 km || 
|-id=069 bgcolor=#fefefe
| 243069 ||  || — || April 14, 2007 || Kitt Peak || Spacewatch || — || align=right | 1.6 km || 
|-id=070 bgcolor=#d6d6d6
| 243070 ||  || — || April 15, 2007 || Kitt Peak || Spacewatch || — || align=right | 5.5 km || 
|-id=071 bgcolor=#d6d6d6
| 243071 ||  || — || April 15, 2007 || Kitt Peak || Spacewatch || — || align=right | 6.9 km || 
|-id=072 bgcolor=#E9E9E9
| 243072 ||  || — || April 16, 2007 || Mount Lemmon || Mount Lemmon Survey || NEM || align=right | 3.7 km || 
|-id=073 bgcolor=#d6d6d6
| 243073 Freistetter ||  ||  || April 16, 2007 || Drebach || A. Knöfel || EUP || align=right | 7.2 km || 
|-id=074 bgcolor=#fefefe
| 243074 ||  || — || April 18, 2007 || Mount Lemmon || Mount Lemmon Survey || ERI || align=right | 1.9 km || 
|-id=075 bgcolor=#E9E9E9
| 243075 ||  || — || April 20, 2007 || Socorro || LINEAR || DOR || align=right | 2.9 km || 
|-id=076 bgcolor=#fefefe
| 243076 ||  || — || April 20, 2007 || Kitt Peak || Spacewatch || — || align=right data-sort-value="0.92" | 920 m || 
|-id=077 bgcolor=#d6d6d6
| 243077 ||  || — || April 18, 2007 || Mount Lemmon || Mount Lemmon Survey || EMA || align=right | 4.9 km || 
|-id=078 bgcolor=#fefefe
| 243078 ||  || — || April 24, 2007 || Kitt Peak || Spacewatch || — || align=right | 2.9 km || 
|-id=079 bgcolor=#d6d6d6
| 243079 ||  || — || May 13, 2007 || Tiki || S. F. Hönig, N. Teamo || VER || align=right | 4.7 km || 
|-id=080 bgcolor=#d6d6d6
| 243080 ||  || — || May 17, 2007 || Catalina || CSS || — || align=right | 4.7 km || 
|-id=081 bgcolor=#d6d6d6
| 243081 ||  || — || June 12, 2007 || Kitt Peak || Spacewatch || — || align=right | 4.6 km || 
|-id=082 bgcolor=#fefefe
| 243082 ||  || — || June 15, 2007 || Kitt Peak || Spacewatch || — || align=right | 1.1 km || 
|-id=083 bgcolor=#E9E9E9
| 243083 ||  || — || July 15, 2007 || Siding Spring || SSS || — || align=right | 3.1 km || 
|-id=084 bgcolor=#C2FFFF
| 243084 ||  || — || July 11, 2007 || Siding Spring || SSS || L4 || align=right | 18 km || 
|-id=085 bgcolor=#E9E9E9
| 243085 ||  || — || July 22, 2007 || Siding Spring || SSS || PAL || align=right | 4.2 km || 
|-id=086 bgcolor=#E9E9E9
| 243086 ||  || — || August 5, 2007 || 7300 Observatory || W. K. Y. Yeung || — || align=right | 2.8 km || 
|-id=087 bgcolor=#fefefe
| 243087 ||  || — || August 13, 2007 || Socorro || LINEAR || — || align=right data-sort-value="0.72" | 720 m || 
|-id=088 bgcolor=#C2FFFF
| 243088 ||  || — || August 11, 2007 || Siding Spring || SSS || L4 || align=right | 17 km || 
|-id=089 bgcolor=#E9E9E9
| 243089 ||  || — || August 21, 2007 || Hibiscus || S. F. Hönig, N. Teamo || — || align=right | 3.7 km || 
|-id=090 bgcolor=#fefefe
| 243090 ||  || — || August 22, 2007 || Hibiscus || S. F. Hönig, N. Teamo || — || align=right data-sort-value="0.91" | 910 m || 
|-id=091 bgcolor=#fefefe
| 243091 ||  || — || August 21, 2007 || Anderson Mesa || LONEOS || MAS || align=right | 1.1 km || 
|-id=092 bgcolor=#fefefe
| 243092 ||  || — || August 24, 2007 || Kitt Peak || Spacewatch || — || align=right | 1.2 km || 
|-id=093 bgcolor=#E9E9E9
| 243093 || 2007 RK || — || September 1, 2007 || Dauban || Chante-Perdrix Obs. || HOF || align=right | 3.6 km || 
|-id=094 bgcolor=#fefefe
| 243094 Dirlewanger ||  ||  || September 6, 2007 || Wildberg || R. Apitzsch || NYS || align=right data-sort-value="0.78" | 780 m || 
|-id=095 bgcolor=#fefefe
| 243095 ||  || — || September 3, 2007 || Catalina || CSS || V || align=right | 1.0 km || 
|-id=096 bgcolor=#d6d6d6
| 243096 Klauswerner ||  ||  || September 12, 2007 || Wildberg || R. Apitzsch || — || align=right | 4.9 km || 
|-id=097 bgcolor=#E9E9E9
| 243097 Batavia ||  ||  || September 12, 2007 || Gaisberg || R. Gierlinger || — || align=right | 3.1 km || 
|-id=098 bgcolor=#E9E9E9
| 243098 ||  || — || September 3, 2007 || Catalina || CSS || — || align=right | 3.4 km || 
|-id=099 bgcolor=#fefefe
| 243099 ||  || — || September 4, 2007 || Catalina || CSS || FLO || align=right data-sort-value="0.88" | 880 m || 
|-id=100 bgcolor=#FA8072
| 243100 ||  || — || September 5, 2007 || Catalina || CSS || — || align=right data-sort-value="0.72" | 720 m || 
|}

243101–243200 

|-bgcolor=#fefefe
| 243101 ||  || — || September 9, 2007 || Kitt Peak || Spacewatch || — || align=right | 2.0 km || 
|-id=102 bgcolor=#d6d6d6
| 243102 ||  || — || September 9, 2007 || Mount Lemmon || Mount Lemmon Survey || — || align=right | 5.1 km || 
|-id=103 bgcolor=#E9E9E9
| 243103 ||  || — || September 9, 2007 || Kitt Peak || Spacewatch || — || align=right | 3.2 km || 
|-id=104 bgcolor=#d6d6d6
| 243104 ||  || — || September 9, 2007 || Kitt Peak || Spacewatch || VER || align=right | 4.7 km || 
|-id=105 bgcolor=#fefefe
| 243105 ||  || — || September 11, 2007 || Catalina || CSS || NYS || align=right data-sort-value="0.91" | 910 m || 
|-id=106 bgcolor=#E9E9E9
| 243106 ||  || — || September 11, 2007 || Kitt Peak || Spacewatch || MIS || align=right | 3.1 km || 
|-id=107 bgcolor=#fefefe
| 243107 ||  || — || September 11, 2007 || Kitt Peak || Spacewatch || — || align=right data-sort-value="0.92" | 920 m || 
|-id=108 bgcolor=#fefefe
| 243108 ||  || — || September 11, 2007 || Kitt Peak || Spacewatch || — || align=right data-sort-value="0.87" | 870 m || 
|-id=109 bgcolor=#fefefe
| 243109 Hansludwig ||  ||  || September 12, 2007 || Taunus || S. Karge, E. Schwab || — || align=right | 1.2 km || 
|-id=110 bgcolor=#fefefe
| 243110 ||  || — || September 13, 2007 || Anderson Mesa || LONEOS || — || align=right | 1.1 km || 
|-id=111 bgcolor=#fefefe
| 243111 ||  || — || September 15, 2007 || Lulin Observatory || LUSS || V || align=right data-sort-value="0.99" | 990 m || 
|-id=112 bgcolor=#fefefe
| 243112 ||  || — || September 13, 2007 || Socorro || LINEAR || V || align=right data-sort-value="0.80" | 800 m || 
|-id=113 bgcolor=#E9E9E9
| 243113 ||  || — || September 14, 2007 || Socorro || LINEAR || — || align=right | 3.9 km || 
|-id=114 bgcolor=#E9E9E9
| 243114 ||  || — || September 11, 2007 || Catalina || CSS || MIT || align=right | 3.0 km || 
|-id=115 bgcolor=#fefefe
| 243115 ||  || — || September 11, 2007 || Purple Mountain || PMO NEO || V || align=right | 1.2 km || 
|-id=116 bgcolor=#fefefe
| 243116 ||  || — || September 10, 2007 || Kitt Peak || Spacewatch || — || align=right data-sort-value="0.98" | 980 m || 
|-id=117 bgcolor=#fefefe
| 243117 ||  || — || September 9, 2007 || Mount Lemmon || Mount Lemmon Survey || MAS || align=right data-sort-value="0.97" | 970 m || 
|-id=118 bgcolor=#E9E9E9
| 243118 ||  || — || September 11, 2007 || Mount Lemmon || Mount Lemmon Survey || HOF || align=right | 3.2 km || 
|-id=119 bgcolor=#d6d6d6
| 243119 ||  || — || September 13, 2007 || Catalina || CSS || — || align=right | 3.1 km || 
|-id=120 bgcolor=#E9E9E9
| 243120 ||  || — || September 13, 2007 || Catalina || CSS || NEM || align=right | 2.8 km || 
|-id=121 bgcolor=#d6d6d6
| 243121 ||  || — || September 13, 2007 || Kitt Peak || Spacewatch || — || align=right | 5.8 km || 
|-id=122 bgcolor=#d6d6d6
| 243122 ||  || — || September 13, 2007 || Kitt Peak || Spacewatch || HYG || align=right | 4.4 km || 
|-id=123 bgcolor=#fefefe
| 243123 ||  || — || September 14, 2007 || Mount Lemmon || Mount Lemmon Survey || NYS || align=right data-sort-value="0.91" | 910 m || 
|-id=124 bgcolor=#fefefe
| 243124 ||  || — || September 14, 2007 || Catalina || CSS || V || align=right | 1.2 km || 
|-id=125 bgcolor=#fefefe
| 243125 ||  || — || September 11, 2007 || Kitt Peak || Spacewatch || MAS || align=right data-sort-value="0.84" | 840 m || 
|-id=126 bgcolor=#d6d6d6
| 243126 ||  || — || September 12, 2007 || Catalina || CSS || URS || align=right | 5.1 km || 
|-id=127 bgcolor=#FA8072
| 243127 ||  || — || September 14, 2007 || Catalina || CSS || — || align=right | 1.4 km || 
|-id=128 bgcolor=#d6d6d6
| 243128 ||  || — || September 14, 2007 || Mount Lemmon || Mount Lemmon Survey || — || align=right | 4.8 km || 
|-id=129 bgcolor=#d6d6d6
| 243129 ||  || — || September 15, 2007 || Kitt Peak || Spacewatch || LIX || align=right | 5.4 km || 
|-id=130 bgcolor=#d6d6d6
| 243130 ||  || — || September 6, 2007 || Siding Spring || SSS || — || align=right | 6.1 km || 
|-id=131 bgcolor=#d6d6d6
| 243131 ||  || — || September 15, 2007 || Catalina || CSS || — || align=right | 6.1 km || 
|-id=132 bgcolor=#d6d6d6
| 243132 ||  || — || September 12, 2007 || Catalina || CSS || — || align=right | 5.1 km || 
|-id=133 bgcolor=#d6d6d6
| 243133 ||  || — || September 10, 2007 || Kitt Peak || Spacewatch || HYG || align=right | 4.2 km || 
|-id=134 bgcolor=#E9E9E9
| 243134 ||  || — || September 10, 2007 || Kitt Peak || Spacewatch || — || align=right | 3.2 km || 
|-id=135 bgcolor=#fefefe
| 243135 ||  || — || September 13, 2007 || Mount Lemmon || Mount Lemmon Survey || NYS || align=right data-sort-value="0.97" | 970 m || 
|-id=136 bgcolor=#fefefe
| 243136 ||  || — || September 4, 2007 || Catalina || CSS || — || align=right | 1.8 km || 
|-id=137 bgcolor=#fefefe
| 243137 ||  || — || September 5, 2007 || Catalina || CSS || V || align=right | 1.2 km || 
|-id=138 bgcolor=#E9E9E9
| 243138 ||  || — || September 15, 2007 || Anderson Mesa || LONEOS || — || align=right | 3.8 km || 
|-id=139 bgcolor=#d6d6d6
| 243139 ||  || — || September 10, 2007 || Mount Lemmon || Mount Lemmon Survey || — || align=right | 3.1 km || 
|-id=140 bgcolor=#E9E9E9
| 243140 ||  || — || September 15, 2007 || Kitt Peak || Spacewatch || WIT || align=right | 1.4 km || 
|-id=141 bgcolor=#d6d6d6
| 243141 ||  || — || October 6, 2007 || Dauban || Chante-Perdrix Obs. || EOS || align=right | 5.6 km || 
|-id=142 bgcolor=#d6d6d6
| 243142 ||  || — || October 6, 2007 || Dauban || Chante-Perdrix Obs. || — || align=right | 5.4 km || 
|-id=143 bgcolor=#fefefe
| 243143 ||  || — || October 7, 2007 || Mayhill || A. Lowe || ERI || align=right | 1.9 km || 
|-id=144 bgcolor=#E9E9E9
| 243144 ||  || — || October 6, 2007 || Socorro || LINEAR || — || align=right | 3.2 km || 
|-id=145 bgcolor=#fefefe
| 243145 ||  || — || October 8, 2007 || 7300 || W. K. Y. Yeung || NYS || align=right | 1.0 km || 
|-id=146 bgcolor=#fefefe
| 243146 ||  || — || October 7, 2007 || Nashville || R. Clingan || NYS || align=right | 1.1 km || 
|-id=147 bgcolor=#FFC2E0
| 243147 ||  || — || October 9, 2007 || Catalina || CSS || AMO +1km || align=right data-sort-value="0.91" | 910 m || 
|-id=148 bgcolor=#d6d6d6
| 243148 ||  || — || October 7, 2007 || Črni Vrh || Črni Vrh || EOS || align=right | 4.4 km || 
|-id=149 bgcolor=#d6d6d6
| 243149 ||  || — || October 9, 2007 || Goodricke-Pigott || R. A. Tucker || EUP || align=right | 5.2 km || 
|-id=150 bgcolor=#d6d6d6
| 243150 ||  || — || October 4, 2007 || Kitt Peak || Spacewatch || — || align=right | 4.5 km || 
|-id=151 bgcolor=#E9E9E9
| 243151 ||  || — || October 6, 2007 || Kitt Peak || Spacewatch || — || align=right | 1.5 km || 
|-id=152 bgcolor=#E9E9E9
| 243152 ||  || — || October 6, 2007 || Kitt Peak || Spacewatch || ADE || align=right | 3.1 km || 
|-id=153 bgcolor=#d6d6d6
| 243153 ||  || — || October 8, 2007 || Mount Lemmon || Mount Lemmon Survey || — || align=right | 5.5 km || 
|-id=154 bgcolor=#d6d6d6
| 243154 ||  || — || October 4, 2007 || Kitt Peak || Spacewatch || — || align=right | 3.1 km || 
|-id=155 bgcolor=#E9E9E9
| 243155 ||  || — || October 7, 2007 || Mount Lemmon || Mount Lemmon Survey || AST || align=right | 3.2 km || 
|-id=156 bgcolor=#fefefe
| 243156 ||  || — || October 10, 2007 || Dauban || Chante-Perdrix Obs. || NYS || align=right data-sort-value="0.72" | 720 m || 
|-id=157 bgcolor=#fefefe
| 243157 ||  || — || October 10, 2007 || Lulin || LUSS || NYS || align=right data-sort-value="0.83" | 830 m || 
|-id=158 bgcolor=#fefefe
| 243158 ||  || — || October 11, 2007 || Calvin-Rehoboth || Calvin–Rehoboth Obs. || — || align=right | 1.8 km || 
|-id=159 bgcolor=#C2FFFF
| 243159 ||  || — || October 14, 2007 || Mount Lemmon || Mount Lemmon Survey || L4 || align=right | 18 km || 
|-id=160 bgcolor=#d6d6d6
| 243160 ||  || — || October 15, 2007 || Kleť || Kleť Obs. || — || align=right | 6.0 km || 
|-id=161 bgcolor=#E9E9E9
| 243161 ||  || — || October 5, 2007 || Kitt Peak || Spacewatch || — || align=right | 2.2 km || 
|-id=162 bgcolor=#E9E9E9
| 243162 ||  || — || October 8, 2007 || Mount Lemmon || Mount Lemmon Survey || — || align=right | 1.5 km || 
|-id=163 bgcolor=#fefefe
| 243163 ||  || — || October 7, 2007 || Catalina || CSS || — || align=right | 2.7 km || 
|-id=164 bgcolor=#d6d6d6
| 243164 ||  || — || October 7, 2007 || Catalina || CSS || — || align=right | 5.4 km || 
|-id=165 bgcolor=#E9E9E9
| 243165 ||  || — || October 8, 2007 || Mount Lemmon || Mount Lemmon Survey || — || align=right | 2.0 km || 
|-id=166 bgcolor=#d6d6d6
| 243166 ||  || — || October 7, 2007 || Catalina || CSS || — || align=right | 4.3 km || 
|-id=167 bgcolor=#E9E9E9
| 243167 ||  || — || October 7, 2007 || Catalina || CSS || — || align=right | 3.2 km || 
|-id=168 bgcolor=#E9E9E9
| 243168 ||  || — || October 7, 2007 || Catalina || CSS || — || align=right | 1.9 km || 
|-id=169 bgcolor=#fefefe
| 243169 ||  || — || October 6, 2007 || Kitt Peak || Spacewatch || MAS || align=right | 1.0 km || 
|-id=170 bgcolor=#fefefe
| 243170 ||  || — || October 6, 2007 || Kitt Peak || Spacewatch || NYS || align=right data-sort-value="0.97" | 970 m || 
|-id=171 bgcolor=#d6d6d6
| 243171 ||  || — || October 6, 2007 || Kitt Peak || Spacewatch || KAR || align=right | 1.4 km || 
|-id=172 bgcolor=#E9E9E9
| 243172 ||  || — || October 7, 2007 || Mount Lemmon || Mount Lemmon Survey || HEN || align=right | 1.6 km || 
|-id=173 bgcolor=#d6d6d6
| 243173 ||  || — || October 8, 2007 || Catalina || CSS || EOS || align=right | 6.8 km || 
|-id=174 bgcolor=#d6d6d6
| 243174 ||  || — || October 8, 2007 || Mount Lemmon || Mount Lemmon Survey || — || align=right | 5.4 km || 
|-id=175 bgcolor=#E9E9E9
| 243175 ||  || — || October 8, 2007 || Mount Lemmon || Mount Lemmon Survey || HEN || align=right | 1.5 km || 
|-id=176 bgcolor=#d6d6d6
| 243176 ||  || — || October 9, 2007 || Catalina || CSS || — || align=right | 6.3 km || 
|-id=177 bgcolor=#fefefe
| 243177 ||  || — || October 6, 2007 || Socorro || LINEAR || EUT || align=right data-sort-value="0.99" | 990 m || 
|-id=178 bgcolor=#d6d6d6
| 243178 ||  || — || October 7, 2007 || Socorro || LINEAR || TEL || align=right | 6.2 km || 
|-id=179 bgcolor=#E9E9E9
| 243179 ||  || — || October 9, 2007 || Socorro || LINEAR || — || align=right | 2.0 km || 
|-id=180 bgcolor=#E9E9E9
| 243180 ||  || — || October 11, 2007 || Socorro || LINEAR || HOF || align=right | 4.3 km || 
|-id=181 bgcolor=#d6d6d6
| 243181 ||  || — || October 12, 2007 || Socorro || LINEAR || — || align=right | 4.8 km || 
|-id=182 bgcolor=#E9E9E9
| 243182 ||  || — || October 6, 2007 || Purple Mountain || PMO NEO || — || align=right | 4.2 km || 
|-id=183 bgcolor=#d6d6d6
| 243183 ||  || — || October 7, 2007 || Kitt Peak || Spacewatch || EMA || align=right | 5.6 km || 
|-id=184 bgcolor=#E9E9E9
| 243184 ||  || — || October 7, 2007 || Kitt Peak || Spacewatch || HOF || align=right | 3.9 km || 
|-id=185 bgcolor=#E9E9E9
| 243185 ||  || — || October 8, 2007 || Kitt Peak || Spacewatch || — || align=right | 3.3 km || 
|-id=186 bgcolor=#d6d6d6
| 243186 ||  || — || October 8, 2007 || Kitt Peak || Spacewatch || — || align=right | 5.9 km || 
|-id=187 bgcolor=#E9E9E9
| 243187 ||  || — || October 11, 2007 || Kitt Peak || Spacewatch || — || align=right | 2.1 km || 
|-id=188 bgcolor=#fefefe
| 243188 ||  || — || October 9, 2007 || Kitt Peak || Spacewatch || NYS || align=right | 1.5 km || 
|-id=189 bgcolor=#d6d6d6
| 243189 ||  || — || October 11, 2007 || Catalina || CSS || EOS || align=right | 5.8 km || 
|-id=190 bgcolor=#d6d6d6
| 243190 ||  || — || October 10, 2007 || Mount Lemmon || Mount Lemmon Survey || CRO || align=right | 4.6 km || 
|-id=191 bgcolor=#d6d6d6
| 243191 ||  || — || October 11, 2007 || Kitt Peak || Spacewatch || — || align=right | 5.8 km || 
|-id=192 bgcolor=#d6d6d6
| 243192 ||  || — || October 10, 2007 || Mount Lemmon || Mount Lemmon Survey || — || align=right | 3.1 km || 
|-id=193 bgcolor=#E9E9E9
| 243193 ||  || — || October 12, 2007 || Catalina || CSS || TIN || align=right | 3.9 km || 
|-id=194 bgcolor=#fefefe
| 243194 ||  || — || October 10, 2007 || Catalina || CSS || — || align=right | 2.1 km || 
|-id=195 bgcolor=#d6d6d6
| 243195 ||  || — || October 11, 2007 || Kitt Peak || Spacewatch || — || align=right | 4.5 km || 
|-id=196 bgcolor=#d6d6d6
| 243196 ||  || — || October 15, 2007 || Kitt Peak || Spacewatch || — || align=right | 4.3 km || 
|-id=197 bgcolor=#E9E9E9
| 243197 ||  || — || October 15, 2007 || Catalina || CSS || — || align=right | 2.0 km || 
|-id=198 bgcolor=#E9E9E9
| 243198 ||  || — || October 9, 2007 || Catalina || CSS || EUN || align=right | 2.6 km || 
|-id=199 bgcolor=#d6d6d6
| 243199 ||  || — || October 14, 2007 || Catalina || CSS || — || align=right | 6.4 km || 
|-id=200 bgcolor=#d6d6d6
| 243200 ||  || — || October 10, 2007 || Kitt Peak || Spacewatch || KOR || align=right | 1.8 km || 
|}

243201–243300 

|-bgcolor=#d6d6d6
| 243201 ||  || — || October 13, 2007 || Mount Lemmon || Mount Lemmon Survey || VER || align=right | 5.1 km || 
|-id=202 bgcolor=#d6d6d6
| 243202 ||  || — || October 9, 2007 || Kitt Peak || Spacewatch || — || align=right | 4.2 km || 
|-id=203 bgcolor=#E9E9E9
| 243203 ||  || — || October 15, 2007 || Mount Lemmon || Mount Lemmon Survey || MAR || align=right | 1.0 km || 
|-id=204 bgcolor=#d6d6d6
| 243204 Kubanchoria ||  ||  || October 16, 2007 || Andrushivka || Andrushivka Obs. || — || align=right | 6.3 km || 
|-id=205 bgcolor=#fefefe
| 243205 ||  || — || October 18, 2007 || Socorro || LINEAR || KLI || align=right | 2.7 km || 
|-id=206 bgcolor=#E9E9E9
| 243206 ||  || — || October 19, 2007 || Socorro || LINEAR || EUN || align=right | 1.6 km || 
|-id=207 bgcolor=#fefefe
| 243207 ||  || — || October 16, 2007 || Mount Lemmon || Mount Lemmon Survey || — || align=right | 1.3 km || 
|-id=208 bgcolor=#E9E9E9
| 243208 ||  || — || October 16, 2007 || Mount Lemmon || Mount Lemmon Survey || — || align=right | 1.8 km || 
|-id=209 bgcolor=#d6d6d6
| 243209 ||  || — || October 19, 2007 || Catalina || CSS || — || align=right | 4.5 km || 
|-id=210 bgcolor=#E9E9E9
| 243210 ||  || — || October 16, 2007 || Kitt Peak || Spacewatch || — || align=right | 1.5 km || 
|-id=211 bgcolor=#E9E9E9
| 243211 ||  || — || October 18, 2007 || Mount Lemmon || Mount Lemmon Survey || HOF || align=right | 3.5 km || 
|-id=212 bgcolor=#d6d6d6
| 243212 ||  || — || October 20, 2007 || Mount Lemmon || Mount Lemmon Survey || EOS || align=right | 3.2 km || 
|-id=213 bgcolor=#fefefe
| 243213 ||  || — || October 24, 2007 || Mount Lemmon || Mount Lemmon Survey || — || align=right | 1.3 km || 
|-id=214 bgcolor=#d6d6d6
| 243214 ||  || — || October 30, 2007 || Catalina || CSS || — || align=right | 4.3 km || 
|-id=215 bgcolor=#E9E9E9
| 243215 ||  || — || October 30, 2007 || Kitt Peak || Spacewatch || — || align=right | 1.7 km || 
|-id=216 bgcolor=#d6d6d6
| 243216 ||  || — || October 31, 2007 || Kitt Peak || Spacewatch || — || align=right | 3.1 km || 
|-id=217 bgcolor=#d6d6d6
| 243217 ||  || — || October 18, 2007 || Catalina || CSS || — || align=right | 5.8 km || 
|-id=218 bgcolor=#d6d6d6
| 243218 ||  || — || October 16, 2007 || Catalina || CSS || — || align=right | 5.6 km || 
|-id=219 bgcolor=#E9E9E9
| 243219 ||  || — || November 2, 2007 || Mount Lemmon || Mount Lemmon Survey || BRU || align=right | 7.4 km || 
|-id=220 bgcolor=#d6d6d6
| 243220 ||  || — || November 2, 2007 || Catalina || CSS || — || align=right | 6.6 km || 
|-id=221 bgcolor=#E9E9E9
| 243221 ||  || — || November 2, 2007 || Kitt Peak || Spacewatch || — || align=right | 1.7 km || 
|-id=222 bgcolor=#d6d6d6
| 243222 ||  || — || November 3, 2007 || Kitt Peak || Spacewatch || — || align=right | 4.8 km || 
|-id=223 bgcolor=#fefefe
| 243223 ||  || — || November 1, 2007 || Kitt Peak || Spacewatch || NYS || align=right | 2.3 km || 
|-id=224 bgcolor=#d6d6d6
| 243224 ||  || — || November 1, 2007 || Lulin || LUSS || — || align=right | 4.5 km || 
|-id=225 bgcolor=#d6d6d6
| 243225 ||  || — || November 4, 2007 || Mount Lemmon || Mount Lemmon Survey || — || align=right | 4.3 km || 
|-id=226 bgcolor=#d6d6d6
| 243226 ||  || — || November 1, 2007 || Kitt Peak || Spacewatch || EUP || align=right | 4.5 km || 
|-id=227 bgcolor=#d6d6d6
| 243227 ||  || — || November 2, 2007 || Socorro || LINEAR || EOS || align=right | 4.1 km || 
|-id=228 bgcolor=#d6d6d6
| 243228 ||  || — || November 3, 2007 || Socorro || LINEAR || — || align=right | 5.6 km || 
|-id=229 bgcolor=#d6d6d6
| 243229 ||  || — || November 5, 2007 || Socorro || LINEAR || HYG || align=right | 3.6 km || 
|-id=230 bgcolor=#E9E9E9
| 243230 ||  || — || November 6, 2007 || Socorro || LINEAR || WIT || align=right | 1.7 km || 
|-id=231 bgcolor=#d6d6d6
| 243231 ||  || — || November 3, 2007 || Socorro || LINEAR || — || align=right | 4.2 km || 
|-id=232 bgcolor=#d6d6d6
| 243232 ||  || — || November 3, 2007 || Socorro || LINEAR || — || align=right | 5.0 km || 
|-id=233 bgcolor=#d6d6d6
| 243233 ||  || — || November 7, 2007 || Socorro || LINEAR || — || align=right | 5.8 km || 
|-id=234 bgcolor=#E9E9E9
| 243234 ||  || — || November 5, 2007 || Kitt Peak || Spacewatch || — || align=right | 2.5 km || 
|-id=235 bgcolor=#E9E9E9
| 243235 ||  || — || November 3, 2007 || Lulin || LUSS || MIS || align=right | 3.3 km || 
|-id=236 bgcolor=#d6d6d6
| 243236 ||  || — || November 4, 2007 || Kitt Peak || Spacewatch || URS || align=right | 4.3 km || 
|-id=237 bgcolor=#E9E9E9
| 243237 ||  || — || November 5, 2007 || Kitt Peak || Spacewatch || — || align=right | 1.7 km || 
|-id=238 bgcolor=#d6d6d6
| 243238 ||  || — || November 5, 2007 || Mount Lemmon || Mount Lemmon Survey || 7:4 || align=right | 7.0 km || 
|-id=239 bgcolor=#E9E9E9
| 243239 ||  || — || November 5, 2007 || Kitt Peak || Spacewatch || EUN || align=right | 2.0 km || 
|-id=240 bgcolor=#fefefe
| 243240 ||  || — || November 5, 2007 || Kitt Peak || Spacewatch || — || align=right | 2.5 km || 
|-id=241 bgcolor=#d6d6d6
| 243241 ||  || — || November 14, 2007 || La Sagra || OAM Obs. || LUT || align=right | 7.6 km || 
|-id=242 bgcolor=#E9E9E9
| 243242 ||  || — || November 9, 2007 || Purple Mountain || PMO NEO || — || align=right | 1.9 km || 
|-id=243 bgcolor=#d6d6d6
| 243243 ||  || — || November 9, 2007 || Kitt Peak || Spacewatch || K-2 || align=right | 1.9 km || 
|-id=244 bgcolor=#E9E9E9
| 243244 ||  || — || November 11, 2007 || Mount Lemmon || Mount Lemmon Survey || — || align=right | 3.3 km || 
|-id=245 bgcolor=#d6d6d6
| 243245 ||  || — || November 7, 2007 || Kitt Peak || Spacewatch || THM || align=right | 2.6 km || 
|-id=246 bgcolor=#d6d6d6
| 243246 ||  || — || November 8, 2007 || Kitt Peak || Spacewatch || EOS || align=right | 2.5 km || 
|-id=247 bgcolor=#d6d6d6
| 243247 ||  || — || November 13, 2007 || Kitt Peak || Spacewatch || — || align=right | 4.1 km || 
|-id=248 bgcolor=#d6d6d6
| 243248 ||  || — || November 12, 2007 || Catalina || CSS || ALA || align=right | 8.1 km || 
|-id=249 bgcolor=#E9E9E9
| 243249 ||  || — || November 15, 2007 || Anderson Mesa || LONEOS || WIT || align=right | 1.4 km || 
|-id=250 bgcolor=#E9E9E9
| 243250 ||  || — || November 12, 2007 || Mount Lemmon || Mount Lemmon Survey || — || align=right | 3.4 km || 
|-id=251 bgcolor=#E9E9E9
| 243251 ||  || — || November 9, 2007 || Catalina || CSS || EUN || align=right | 2.4 km || 
|-id=252 bgcolor=#d6d6d6
| 243252 ||  || — || November 18, 2007 || Socorro || LINEAR || EOS || align=right | 3.3 km || 
|-id=253 bgcolor=#E9E9E9
| 243253 ||  || — || November 18, 2007 || Mount Lemmon || Mount Lemmon Survey || AGN || align=right | 1.6 km || 
|-id=254 bgcolor=#E9E9E9
| 243254 ||  || — || November 17, 2007 || Kitt Peak || Spacewatch || EUN || align=right | 1.3 km || 
|-id=255 bgcolor=#d6d6d6
| 243255 ||  || — || November 17, 2007 || Kitt Peak || Spacewatch || — || align=right | 4.1 km || 
|-id=256 bgcolor=#E9E9E9
| 243256 ||  || — || December 4, 2007 || Kitt Peak || Spacewatch || — || align=right | 3.5 km || 
|-id=257 bgcolor=#d6d6d6
| 243257 ||  || — || December 4, 2007 || Kitt Peak || Spacewatch || — || align=right | 3.9 km || 
|-id=258 bgcolor=#d6d6d6
| 243258 ||  || — || December 5, 2007 || Socorro || LINEAR || — || align=right | 7.4 km || 
|-id=259 bgcolor=#E9E9E9
| 243259 ||  || — || December 15, 2007 || Mount Lemmon || Mount Lemmon Survey || NEM || align=right | 2.9 km || 
|-id=260 bgcolor=#d6d6d6
| 243260 ||  || — || December 13, 2007 || Socorro || LINEAR || — || align=right | 4.2 km || 
|-id=261 bgcolor=#d6d6d6
| 243261 ||  || — || December 18, 2007 || Mount Lemmon || Mount Lemmon Survey || — || align=right | 5.3 km || 
|-id=262 bgcolor=#E9E9E9
| 243262 Korkosz ||  ||  || December 31, 2007 || Schiaparelli || L. Buzzi || — || align=right | 4.0 km || 
|-id=263 bgcolor=#d6d6d6
| 243263 ||  || — || December 28, 2007 || Kitt Peak || Spacewatch || — || align=right | 5.9 km || 
|-id=264 bgcolor=#E9E9E9
| 243264 ||  || — || December 18, 2007 || Catalina || CSS || — || align=right | 1.7 km || 
|-id=265 bgcolor=#E9E9E9
| 243265 ||  || — || December 20, 2007 || Kitt Peak || Spacewatch || — || align=right | 2.9 km || 
|-id=266 bgcolor=#d6d6d6
| 243266 || 2008 AW || — || January 4, 2008 || Pla D'Arguines || R. Ferrando || — || align=right | 5.8 km || 
|-id=267 bgcolor=#d6d6d6
| 243267 ||  || — || January 10, 2008 || Mount Lemmon || Mount Lemmon Survey || HIL3:2 || align=right | 5.2 km || 
|-id=268 bgcolor=#E9E9E9
| 243268 ||  || — || January 10, 2008 || Kitt Peak || Spacewatch || — || align=right | 2.0 km || 
|-id=269 bgcolor=#E9E9E9
| 243269 ||  || — || January 10, 2008 || Kitt Peak || Spacewatch || — || align=right | 2.8 km || 
|-id=270 bgcolor=#d6d6d6
| 243270 ||  || — || January 11, 2008 || Mount Lemmon || Mount Lemmon Survey || URS || align=right | 4.6 km || 
|-id=271 bgcolor=#d6d6d6
| 243271 ||  || — || January 16, 2008 || Kitt Peak || Spacewatch || — || align=right | 3.6 km || 
|-id=272 bgcolor=#d6d6d6
| 243272 ||  || — || January 18, 2008 || Kitt Peak || Spacewatch || — || align=right | 5.9 km || 
|-id=273 bgcolor=#d6d6d6
| 243273 ||  || — || January 30, 2008 || Mount Lemmon || Mount Lemmon Survey || — || align=right | 4.6 km || 
|-id=274 bgcolor=#d6d6d6
| 243274 ||  || — || January 30, 2008 || Socorro || LINEAR || EOS || align=right | 3.1 km || 
|-id=275 bgcolor=#d6d6d6
| 243275 ||  || — || February 3, 2008 || Catalina || CSS || — || align=right | 5.5 km || 
|-id=276 bgcolor=#d6d6d6
| 243276 ||  || — || February 2, 2008 || Kitt Peak || Spacewatch || THM || align=right | 3.1 km || 
|-id=277 bgcolor=#d6d6d6
| 243277 ||  || — || February 2, 2008 || Kitt Peak || Spacewatch || — || align=right | 3.7 km || 
|-id=278 bgcolor=#d6d6d6
| 243278 ||  || — || February 7, 2008 || Kitt Peak || Spacewatch || — || align=right | 3.0 km || 
|-id=279 bgcolor=#d6d6d6
| 243279 ||  || — || February 7, 2008 || Majorca || OAM Obs. || LIX || align=right | 5.6 km || 
|-id=280 bgcolor=#E9E9E9
| 243280 ||  || — || February 7, 2008 || Mount Lemmon || Mount Lemmon Survey || KRM || align=right | 2.7 km || 
|-id=281 bgcolor=#d6d6d6
| 243281 ||  || — || February 7, 2008 || Mount Lemmon || Mount Lemmon Survey || — || align=right | 4.5 km || 
|-id=282 bgcolor=#d6d6d6
| 243282 ||  || — || February 7, 2008 || Mount Lemmon || Mount Lemmon Survey || — || align=right | 4.8 km || 
|-id=283 bgcolor=#d6d6d6
| 243283 ||  || — || February 9, 2008 || Kitt Peak || Spacewatch || — || align=right | 2.4 km || 
|-id=284 bgcolor=#d6d6d6
| 243284 ||  || — || February 9, 2008 || Kitt Peak || Spacewatch || — || align=right | 4.2 km || 
|-id=285 bgcolor=#d6d6d6
| 243285 Fauvaud ||  ||  || February 11, 2008 || Nogales || J.-C. Merlin || 7:4 || align=right | 5.0 km || 
|-id=286 bgcolor=#d6d6d6
| 243286 ||  || — || February 13, 2008 || Catalina || CSS || — || align=right | 5.0 km || 
|-id=287 bgcolor=#d6d6d6
| 243287 ||  || — || February 1, 2008 || Catalina || CSS || EUP || align=right | 5.6 km || 
|-id=288 bgcolor=#d6d6d6
| 243288 ||  || — || February 8, 2008 || Kitt Peak || Spacewatch || — || align=right | 4.3 km || 
|-id=289 bgcolor=#E9E9E9
| 243289 ||  || — || February 27, 2008 || Catalina || CSS || PAD || align=right | 3.4 km || 
|-id=290 bgcolor=#E9E9E9
| 243290 ||  || — || February 27, 2008 || Kitt Peak || Spacewatch || NEM || align=right | 3.1 km || 
|-id=291 bgcolor=#d6d6d6
| 243291 ||  || — || February 28, 2008 || Kitt Peak || Spacewatch || — || align=right | 5.0 km || 
|-id=292 bgcolor=#fefefe
| 243292 ||  || — || February 27, 2008 || Catalina || CSS || — || align=right | 1.3 km || 
|-id=293 bgcolor=#d6d6d6
| 243293 ||  || — || February 27, 2008 || Mount Lemmon || Mount Lemmon Survey || EOS || align=right | 2.6 km || 
|-id=294 bgcolor=#d6d6d6
| 243294 ||  || — || February 18, 2008 || Mount Lemmon || Mount Lemmon Survey || — || align=right | 5.6 km || 
|-id=295 bgcolor=#d6d6d6
| 243295 ||  || — || March 1, 2008 || Kitt Peak || Spacewatch || — || align=right | 4.5 km || 
|-id=296 bgcolor=#d6d6d6
| 243296 ||  || — || March 1, 2008 || Kitt Peak || Spacewatch || — || align=right | 5.0 km || 
|-id=297 bgcolor=#d6d6d6
| 243297 ||  || — || March 8, 2008 || Catalina || CSS || — || align=right | 5.0 km || 
|-id=298 bgcolor=#FFC2E0
| 243298 ||  || — || March 8, 2008 || Socorro || LINEAR || AMO +1km || align=right | 2.6 km || 
|-id=299 bgcolor=#d6d6d6
| 243299 ||  || — || March 7, 2008 || Mount Lemmon || Mount Lemmon Survey || — || align=right | 4.4 km || 
|-id=300 bgcolor=#d6d6d6
| 243300 ||  || — || March 9, 2008 || Kitt Peak || Spacewatch || — || align=right | 4.0 km || 
|}

243301–243400 

|-bgcolor=#fefefe
| 243301 ||  || — || March 11, 2008 || Kitt Peak || Spacewatch || — || align=right | 1.9 km || 
|-id=302 bgcolor=#d6d6d6
| 243302 ||  || — || March 28, 2008 || Mount Lemmon || Mount Lemmon Survey || — || align=right | 3.1 km || 
|-id=303 bgcolor=#E9E9E9
| 243303 ||  || — || March 28, 2008 || Kitt Peak || Spacewatch || — || align=right | 2.5 km || 
|-id=304 bgcolor=#E9E9E9
| 243304 ||  || — || April 6, 2008 || Kitt Peak || Spacewatch || — || align=right | 1.2 km || 
|-id=305 bgcolor=#fefefe
| 243305 ||  || — || April 15, 2008 || Kitt Peak || Spacewatch || NYS || align=right data-sort-value="0.81" | 810 m || 
|-id=306 bgcolor=#fefefe
| 243306 ||  || — || May 3, 2008 || Kitt Peak || Spacewatch || NYS || align=right | 1.8 km || 
|-id=307 bgcolor=#E9E9E9
| 243307 ||  || — || May 27, 2008 || Kitt Peak || Spacewatch || MIS || align=right | 2.9 km || 
|-id=308 bgcolor=#E9E9E9
| 243308 ||  || — || May 29, 2008 || Kitt Peak || Spacewatch || — || align=right | 2.4 km || 
|-id=309 bgcolor=#E9E9E9
| 243309 ||  || — || July 28, 2008 || La Sagra || OAM Obs. || — || align=right | 3.8 km || 
|-id=310 bgcolor=#d6d6d6
| 243310 ||  || — || July 30, 2008 || Mount Lemmon || Mount Lemmon Survey || MEL || align=right | 5.9 km || 
|-id=311 bgcolor=#d6d6d6
| 243311 ||  || — || August 10, 2008 || La Sagra || OAM Obs. || HIL3:2 || align=right | 6.3 km || 
|-id=312 bgcolor=#d6d6d6
| 243312 ||  || — || August 26, 2008 || Socorro || LINEAR || — || align=right | 4.9 km || 
|-id=313 bgcolor=#C2FFFF
| 243313 ||  || — || September 2, 2008 || Kitt Peak || Spacewatch || L4 || align=right | 9.9 km || 
|-id=314 bgcolor=#C2FFFF
| 243314 ||  || — || September 4, 2008 || Kitt Peak || Spacewatch || L4 || align=right | 14 km || 
|-id=315 bgcolor=#C2FFFF
| 243315 ||  || — || September 4, 2008 || Kitt Peak || Spacewatch || L4 || align=right | 9.7 km || 
|-id=316 bgcolor=#C2FFFF
| 243316 ||  || — || September 2, 2008 || Kitt Peak || Spacewatch || L4006 || align=right | 11 km || 
|-id=317 bgcolor=#fefefe
| 243317 ||  || — || September 7, 2008 || Catalina || CSS || — || align=right | 2.4 km || 
|-id=318 bgcolor=#C2FFFF
| 243318 ||  || — || September 2, 2008 || Kitt Peak || Spacewatch || L4 || align=right | 12 km || 
|-id=319 bgcolor=#d6d6d6
| 243319 ||  || — || September 2, 2008 || Kitt Peak || Spacewatch || EUP || align=right | 6.5 km || 
|-id=320 bgcolor=#d6d6d6
| 243320 Jackuipers ||  ||  || September 24, 2008 || Calvin-Rehoboth || Calvin–Rehoboth Obs. || 7:4 || align=right | 5.8 km || 
|-id=321 bgcolor=#d6d6d6
| 243321 ||  || — || September 19, 2008 || Kitt Peak || Spacewatch || 7:4 || align=right | 4.7 km || 
|-id=322 bgcolor=#C2FFFF
| 243322 ||  || — || September 20, 2008 || Kitt Peak || Spacewatch || L4 || align=right | 12 km || 
|-id=323 bgcolor=#C2FFFF
| 243323 ||  || — || September 20, 2008 || Mount Lemmon || Mount Lemmon Survey || L4 || align=right | 14 km || 
|-id=324 bgcolor=#E9E9E9
| 243324 ||  || — || September 21, 2008 || Mount Lemmon || Mount Lemmon Survey || — || align=right | 1.8 km || 
|-id=325 bgcolor=#C2FFFF
| 243325 ||  || — || September 22, 2008 || Socorro || LINEAR || L4 || align=right | 13 km || 
|-id=326 bgcolor=#E9E9E9
| 243326 ||  || — || September 23, 2008 || Catalina || CSS || CLO || align=right | 3.5 km || 
|-id=327 bgcolor=#E9E9E9
| 243327 ||  || — || September 25, 2008 || Kitt Peak || Spacewatch || — || align=right | 2.4 km || 
|-id=328 bgcolor=#fefefe
| 243328 ||  || — || September 24, 2008 || Kitt Peak || Spacewatch || — || align=right | 1.5 km || 
|-id=329 bgcolor=#E9E9E9
| 243329 ||  || — || September 23, 2008 || Kitt Peak || Spacewatch || NEM || align=right | 2.8 km || 
|-id=330 bgcolor=#E9E9E9
| 243330 ||  || — || October 1, 2008 || Mount Lemmon || Mount Lemmon Survey || — || align=right | 2.6 km || 
|-id=331 bgcolor=#fefefe
| 243331 ||  || — || October 1, 2008 || Mount Lemmon || Mount Lemmon Survey || — || align=right data-sort-value="0.98" | 980 m || 
|-id=332 bgcolor=#E9E9E9
| 243332 ||  || — || October 1, 2008 || Mount Lemmon || Mount Lemmon Survey || — || align=right | 3.1 km || 
|-id=333 bgcolor=#E9E9E9
| 243333 ||  || — || October 2, 2008 || Kitt Peak || Spacewatch || — || align=right | 3.0 km || 
|-id=334 bgcolor=#C2FFFF
| 243334 ||  || — || October 6, 2008 || Mount Lemmon || Mount Lemmon Survey || L4ERY || align=right | 13 km || 
|-id=335 bgcolor=#E9E9E9
| 243335 ||  || — || October 8, 2008 || Mount Lemmon || Mount Lemmon Survey || — || align=right | 2.1 km || 
|-id=336 bgcolor=#d6d6d6
| 243336 ||  || — || October 4, 2008 || Mount Lemmon || Mount Lemmon Survey || — || align=right | 4.2 km || 
|-id=337 bgcolor=#d6d6d6
| 243337 ||  || — || October 8, 2008 || Catalina || CSS || — || align=right | 4.2 km || 
|-id=338 bgcolor=#E9E9E9
| 243338 ||  || — || October 9, 2008 || Mount Lemmon || Mount Lemmon Survey || — || align=right | 2.7 km || 
|-id=339 bgcolor=#fefefe
| 243339 ||  || — || October 23, 2008 || Socorro || LINEAR || H || align=right data-sort-value="0.83" | 830 m || 
|-id=340 bgcolor=#E9E9E9
| 243340 ||  || — || October 17, 2008 || Kitt Peak || Spacewatch || POS || align=right | 3.0 km || 
|-id=341 bgcolor=#d6d6d6
| 243341 ||  || — || October 21, 2008 || Kitt Peak || Spacewatch || — || align=right | 5.6 km || 
|-id=342 bgcolor=#E9E9E9
| 243342 ||  || — || October 21, 2008 || Kitt Peak || Spacewatch || — || align=right | 3.2 km || 
|-id=343 bgcolor=#d6d6d6
| 243343 ||  || — || October 22, 2008 || Kitt Peak || Spacewatch || — || align=right | 3.0 km || 
|-id=344 bgcolor=#fefefe
| 243344 ||  || — || October 23, 2008 || Kitt Peak || Spacewatch || — || align=right | 1.2 km || 
|-id=345 bgcolor=#E9E9E9
| 243345 ||  || — || October 23, 2008 || Kitt Peak || Spacewatch || HOF || align=right | 3.4 km || 
|-id=346 bgcolor=#E9E9E9
| 243346 ||  || — || October 23, 2008 || Mount Lemmon || Mount Lemmon Survey || NEM || align=right | 2.7 km || 
|-id=347 bgcolor=#d6d6d6
| 243347 ||  || — || October 23, 2008 || Kitt Peak || Spacewatch || — || align=right | 5.5 km || 
|-id=348 bgcolor=#d6d6d6
| 243348 ||  || — || October 27, 2008 || Socorro || LINEAR || — || align=right | 5.3 km || 
|-id=349 bgcolor=#d6d6d6
| 243349 ||  || — || October 28, 2008 || Socorro || LINEAR || EUP || align=right | 7.6 km || 
|-id=350 bgcolor=#d6d6d6
| 243350 ||  || — || October 28, 2008 || Goodricke-Pigott || R. A. Tucker || EUP || align=right | 5.6 km || 
|-id=351 bgcolor=#fefefe
| 243351 ||  || — || October 24, 2008 || Catalina || CSS || — || align=right | 2.0 km || 
|-id=352 bgcolor=#E9E9E9
| 243352 ||  || — || October 25, 2008 || Kitt Peak || Spacewatch || HOF || align=right | 2.9 km || 
|-id=353 bgcolor=#E9E9E9
| 243353 ||  || — || October 28, 2008 || Kitt Peak || Spacewatch || — || align=right | 2.9 km || 
|-id=354 bgcolor=#d6d6d6
| 243354 ||  || — || October 29, 2008 || Kitt Peak || Spacewatch || — || align=right | 4.9 km || 
|-id=355 bgcolor=#d6d6d6
| 243355 ||  || — || October 30, 2008 || Mount Lemmon || Mount Lemmon Survey || — || align=right | 3.0 km || 
|-id=356 bgcolor=#d6d6d6
| 243356 ||  || — || October 31, 2008 || Kitt Peak || Spacewatch || HYG || align=right | 4.0 km || 
|-id=357 bgcolor=#d6d6d6
| 243357 ||  || — || November 1, 2008 || Mount Lemmon || Mount Lemmon Survey || — || align=right | 3.7 km || 
|-id=358 bgcolor=#fefefe
| 243358 ||  || — || November 1, 2008 || Mount Lemmon || Mount Lemmon Survey || — || align=right | 1.4 km || 
|-id=359 bgcolor=#d6d6d6
| 243359 ||  || — || November 3, 2008 || Kitt Peak || Spacewatch || BRA || align=right | 2.5 km || 
|-id=360 bgcolor=#d6d6d6
| 243360 ||  || — || November 3, 2008 || Kitt Peak || Spacewatch || — || align=right | 2.3 km || 
|-id=361 bgcolor=#d6d6d6
| 243361 ||  || — || November 17, 2008 || Kitt Peak || Spacewatch || — || align=right | 4.2 km || 
|-id=362 bgcolor=#d6d6d6
| 243362 ||  || — || November 17, 2008 || Kitt Peak || Spacewatch || — || align=right | 4.0 km || 
|-id=363 bgcolor=#d6d6d6
| 243363 ||  || — || November 22, 2008 || Mayhill || A. Lowe || — || align=right | 6.7 km || 
|-id=364 bgcolor=#d6d6d6
| 243364 ||  || — || November 18, 2008 || Socorro || LINEAR || EOS || align=right | 3.3 km || 
|-id=365 bgcolor=#fefefe
| 243365 ||  || — || November 18, 2008 || Kitt Peak || Spacewatch || NYS || align=right data-sort-value="0.81" | 810 m || 
|-id=366 bgcolor=#d6d6d6
| 243366 ||  || — || November 19, 2008 || Mount Lemmon || Mount Lemmon Survey || — || align=right | 1.8 km || 
|-id=367 bgcolor=#d6d6d6
| 243367 ||  || — || November 20, 2008 || Kitt Peak || Spacewatch || LIX || align=right | 5.1 km || 
|-id=368 bgcolor=#E9E9E9
| 243368 ||  || — || November 22, 2008 || Kitt Peak || Spacewatch || — || align=right | 2.5 km || 
|-id=369 bgcolor=#fefefe
| 243369 ||  || — || November 25, 2008 || Socorro || LINEAR || H || align=right | 1.0 km || 
|-id=370 bgcolor=#fefefe
| 243370 ||  || — || November 30, 2008 || Kitt Peak || Spacewatch || FLO || align=right | 2.9 km || 
|-id=371 bgcolor=#d6d6d6
| 243371 ||  || — || November 30, 2008 || Mount Lemmon || Mount Lemmon Survey || THM || align=right | 3.7 km || 
|-id=372 bgcolor=#fefefe
| 243372 ||  || — || November 22, 2008 || Kitt Peak || Spacewatch || NYS || align=right data-sort-value="0.87" | 870 m || 
|-id=373 bgcolor=#fefefe
| 243373 ||  || — || November 22, 2008 || Kitt Peak || Spacewatch || — || align=right | 1.4 km || 
|-id=374 bgcolor=#d6d6d6
| 243374 ||  || — || December 3, 2008 || Socorro || LINEAR || — || align=right | 3.8 km || 
|-id=375 bgcolor=#E9E9E9
| 243375 ||  || — || December 1, 2008 || Kitt Peak || Spacewatch || — || align=right | 2.6 km || 
|-id=376 bgcolor=#d6d6d6
| 243376 ||  || — || December 2, 2008 || Kitt Peak || Spacewatch || — || align=right | 4.7 km || 
|-id=377 bgcolor=#d6d6d6
| 243377 ||  || — || December 2, 2008 || Kitt Peak || Spacewatch || — || align=right | 3.7 km || 
|-id=378 bgcolor=#d6d6d6
| 243378 ||  || — || December 2, 2008 || Kitt Peak || Spacewatch || — || align=right | 5.8 km || 
|-id=379 bgcolor=#E9E9E9
| 243379 ||  || — || December 7, 2008 || Mount Lemmon || Mount Lemmon Survey || — || align=right | 3.0 km || 
|-id=380 bgcolor=#d6d6d6
| 243380 ||  || — || December 3, 2008 || Mount Lemmon || Mount Lemmon Survey || — || align=right | 4.6 km || 
|-id=381 bgcolor=#fefefe
| 243381 Alessio ||  ||  || December 22, 2008 || Nazaret || G. Muler, J. M. Ruiz || PHO || align=right | 1.9 km || 
|-id=382 bgcolor=#E9E9E9
| 243382 ||  || — || December 21, 2008 || Mount Lemmon || Mount Lemmon Survey || — || align=right | 3.3 km || 
|-id=383 bgcolor=#fefefe
| 243383 ||  || — || December 29, 2008 || Kitt Peak || Spacewatch || MAS || align=right | 1.1 km || 
|-id=384 bgcolor=#E9E9E9
| 243384 ||  || — || December 29, 2008 || Kitt Peak || Spacewatch || — || align=right | 1.6 km || 
|-id=385 bgcolor=#d6d6d6
| 243385 ||  || — || December 29, 2008 || Mount Lemmon || Mount Lemmon Survey || — || align=right | 3.7 km || 
|-id=386 bgcolor=#d6d6d6
| 243386 ||  || — || December 29, 2008 || Mount Lemmon || Mount Lemmon Survey || 7:4 || align=right | 4.3 km || 
|-id=387 bgcolor=#E9E9E9
| 243387 ||  || — || December 29, 2008 || Mount Lemmon || Mount Lemmon Survey || AGN || align=right | 1.7 km || 
|-id=388 bgcolor=#E9E9E9
| 243388 ||  || — || December 29, 2008 || Mount Lemmon || Mount Lemmon Survey || — || align=right | 1.6 km || 
|-id=389 bgcolor=#d6d6d6
| 243389 ||  || — || December 29, 2008 || Kitt Peak || Spacewatch || — || align=right | 4.3 km || 
|-id=390 bgcolor=#d6d6d6
| 243390 ||  || — || December 29, 2008 || Mount Lemmon || Mount Lemmon Survey || HYG || align=right | 4.7 km || 
|-id=391 bgcolor=#fefefe
| 243391 ||  || — || December 29, 2008 || Kitt Peak || Spacewatch || — || align=right | 1.1 km || 
|-id=392 bgcolor=#fefefe
| 243392 ||  || — || December 30, 2008 || Kitt Peak || Spacewatch || — || align=right | 1.0 km || 
|-id=393 bgcolor=#fefefe
| 243393 ||  || — || December 30, 2008 || Kitt Peak || Spacewatch || — || align=right | 2.1 km || 
|-id=394 bgcolor=#E9E9E9
| 243394 ||  || — || December 29, 2008 || Mount Lemmon || Mount Lemmon Survey || — || align=right | 1.1 km || 
|-id=395 bgcolor=#E9E9E9
| 243395 ||  || — || December 21, 2008 || Kitt Peak || Spacewatch || — || align=right | 2.2 km || 
|-id=396 bgcolor=#d6d6d6
| 243396 ||  || — || December 30, 2008 || Catalina || CSS || — || align=right | 5.2 km || 
|-id=397 bgcolor=#d6d6d6
| 243397 ||  || — || December 31, 2008 || Catalina || CSS || TIR || align=right | 3.7 km || 
|-id=398 bgcolor=#E9E9E9
| 243398 ||  || — || December 21, 2008 || Mount Lemmon || Mount Lemmon Survey || — || align=right | 1.1 km || 
|-id=399 bgcolor=#E9E9E9
| 243399 ||  || — || December 29, 2008 || Kitt Peak || Spacewatch || — || align=right | 1.0 km || 
|-id=400 bgcolor=#fefefe
| 243400 ||  || — || January 3, 2009 || Farra d'Isonzo || Farra d'Isonzo || PHO || align=right | 1.9 km || 
|}

243401–243500 

|-bgcolor=#E9E9E9
| 243401 ||  || — || January 15, 2009 || Farra d'Isonzo || Farra d'Isonzo || GEF || align=right | 2.0 km || 
|-id=402 bgcolor=#d6d6d6
| 243402 ||  || — || January 3, 2009 || Kitt Peak || Spacewatch || 7:4 || align=right | 6.4 km || 
|-id=403 bgcolor=#d6d6d6
| 243403 ||  || — || January 3, 2009 || Mount Lemmon || Mount Lemmon Survey || — || align=right | 4.0 km || 
|-id=404 bgcolor=#d6d6d6
| 243404 ||  || — || January 18, 2009 || Socorro || LINEAR || 7:4 || align=right | 5.6 km || 
|-id=405 bgcolor=#fefefe
| 243405 ||  || — || January 17, 2009 || Catalina || CSS || — || align=right | 1.3 km || 
|-id=406 bgcolor=#E9E9E9
| 243406 ||  || — || January 16, 2009 || Kitt Peak || Spacewatch || — || align=right | 2.9 km || 
|-id=407 bgcolor=#E9E9E9
| 243407 ||  || — || January 16, 2009 || Mount Lemmon || Mount Lemmon Survey || — || align=right | 3.2 km || 
|-id=408 bgcolor=#fefefe
| 243408 ||  || — || January 16, 2009 || Mount Lemmon || Mount Lemmon Survey || — || align=right | 1.2 km || 
|-id=409 bgcolor=#d6d6d6
| 243409 ||  || — || January 20, 2009 || Catalina || CSS || — || align=right | 2.7 km || 
|-id=410 bgcolor=#E9E9E9
| 243410 ||  || — || January 25, 2009 || Kitt Peak || Spacewatch || WIT || align=right | 1.3 km || 
|-id=411 bgcolor=#d6d6d6
| 243411 ||  || — || January 25, 2009 || Kitt Peak || Spacewatch || — || align=right | 3.1 km || 
|-id=412 bgcolor=#d6d6d6
| 243412 ||  || — || January 26, 2009 || Kitt Peak || Spacewatch || THM || align=right | 2.6 km || 
|-id=413 bgcolor=#d6d6d6
| 243413 ||  || — || January 26, 2009 || Purple Mountain || PMO NEO || — || align=right | 5.2 km || 
|-id=414 bgcolor=#d6d6d6
| 243414 ||  || — || January 31, 2009 || Kitt Peak || Spacewatch || — || align=right | 3.2 km || 
|-id=415 bgcolor=#E9E9E9
| 243415 ||  || — || January 29, 2009 || Kitt Peak || Spacewatch || — || align=right | 1.3 km || 
|-id=416 bgcolor=#E9E9E9
| 243416 ||  || — || January 29, 2009 || Kitt Peak || Spacewatch || — || align=right | 2.8 km || 
|-id=417 bgcolor=#E9E9E9
| 243417 ||  || — || January 30, 2009 || Kitt Peak || Spacewatch || — || align=right | 2.9 km || 
|-id=418 bgcolor=#E9E9E9
| 243418 ||  || — || January 30, 2009 || Mount Lemmon || Mount Lemmon Survey || — || align=right | 1.5 km || 
|-id=419 bgcolor=#d6d6d6
| 243419 ||  || — || January 17, 2009 || Kitt Peak || Spacewatch || — || align=right | 5.2 km || 
|-id=420 bgcolor=#fefefe
| 243420 ||  || — || January 31, 2009 || Mount Lemmon || Mount Lemmon Survey || — || align=right | 1.6 km || 
|-id=421 bgcolor=#d6d6d6
| 243421 ||  || — || January 26, 2009 || Socorro || LINEAR || ALA || align=right | 5.2 km || 
|-id=422 bgcolor=#E9E9E9
| 243422 ||  || — || January 21, 2009 || Socorro || LINEAR || AER || align=right | 2.1 km || 
|-id=423 bgcolor=#fefefe
| 243423 ||  || — || February 1, 2009 || Mount Lemmon || Mount Lemmon Survey || — || align=right | 1.1 km || 
|-id=424 bgcolor=#d6d6d6
| 243424 ||  || — || February 1, 2009 || Kitt Peak || Spacewatch || — || align=right | 4.3 km || 
|-id=425 bgcolor=#d6d6d6
| 243425 ||  || — || February 14, 2009 || La Sagra || OAM Obs. || — || align=right | 3.4 km || 
|-id=426 bgcolor=#fefefe
| 243426 ||  || — || February 13, 2009 || La Sagra || OAM Obs. || — || align=right | 1.3 km || 
|-id=427 bgcolor=#d6d6d6
| 243427 ||  || — || February 4, 2009 || Mount Lemmon || Mount Lemmon Survey || — || align=right | 5.5 km || 
|-id=428 bgcolor=#d6d6d6
| 243428 ||  || — || February 3, 2009 || Kitt Peak || Spacewatch || — || align=right | 4.1 km || 
|-id=429 bgcolor=#d6d6d6
| 243429 ||  || — || February 4, 2009 || Mount Lemmon || Mount Lemmon Survey || — || align=right | 4.3 km || 
|-id=430 bgcolor=#E9E9E9
| 243430 ||  || — || February 16, 2009 || Dauban || F. Kugel || — || align=right | 1.6 km || 
|-id=431 bgcolor=#fefefe
| 243431 ||  || — || February 20, 2009 || Kitt Peak || Spacewatch || — || align=right | 1.5 km || 
|-id=432 bgcolor=#E9E9E9
| 243432 ||  || — || February 18, 2009 || La Sagra || OAM Obs. || — || align=right | 3.1 km || 
|-id=433 bgcolor=#E9E9E9
| 243433 ||  || — || February 27, 2009 || Mayhill || A. Lowe || — || align=right | 3.3 km || 
|-id=434 bgcolor=#d6d6d6
| 243434 ||  || — || February 19, 2009 || Marly || P. Kocher || — || align=right | 4.0 km || 
|-id=435 bgcolor=#E9E9E9
| 243435 ||  || — || February 22, 2009 || Kitt Peak || Spacewatch || HOF || align=right | 3.8 km || 
|-id=436 bgcolor=#d6d6d6
| 243436 ||  || — || February 22, 2009 || Kitt Peak || Spacewatch || — || align=right | 3.8 km || 
|-id=437 bgcolor=#fefefe
| 243437 ||  || — || February 22, 2009 || Kitt Peak || Spacewatch || MAS || align=right | 1.3 km || 
|-id=438 bgcolor=#d6d6d6
| 243438 ||  || — || February 24, 2009 || Mount Lemmon || Mount Lemmon Survey || 3:2 || align=right | 4.4 km || 
|-id=439 bgcolor=#fefefe
| 243439 ||  || — || February 27, 2009 || Catalina || CSS || FLO || align=right | 1.1 km || 
|-id=440 bgcolor=#E9E9E9
| 243440 Colonia ||  ||  || March 17, 2009 || Taunus || S. Karge, E. Schwab || — || align=right | 2.4 km || 
|-id=441 bgcolor=#fefefe
| 243441 ||  || — || March 17, 2009 || La Sagra || OAM Obs. || NYS || align=right | 2.3 km || 
|-id=442 bgcolor=#fefefe
| 243442 ||  || — || March 16, 2009 || Kitt Peak || Spacewatch || — || align=right | 2.1 km || 
|-id=443 bgcolor=#d6d6d6
| 243443 ||  || — || March 18, 2009 || La Sagra || OAM Obs. || — || align=right | 5.3 km || 
|-id=444 bgcolor=#fefefe
| 243444 ||  || — || March 23, 2009 || La Sagra || OAM Obs. || V || align=right | 1.0 km || 
|-id=445 bgcolor=#E9E9E9
| 243445 ||  || — || March 26, 2009 || Kitt Peak || Spacewatch || ADE || align=right | 3.5 km || 
|-id=446 bgcolor=#d6d6d6
| 243446 ||  || — || March 25, 2009 || Siding Spring || SSS || EUP || align=right | 6.7 km || 
|-id=447 bgcolor=#E9E9E9
| 243447 || 2009 GE || — || April 2, 2009 || Sierra Stars || F. Tozzi || — || align=right | 3.6 km || 
|-id=448 bgcolor=#E9E9E9
| 243448 ||  || — || April 18, 2009 || Kitt Peak || Spacewatch || DOR || align=right | 3.8 km || 
|-id=449 bgcolor=#E9E9E9
| 243449 ||  || — || April 18, 2009 || Cordell-Lorenz || D. T. Durig || — || align=right | 3.5 km || 
|-id=450 bgcolor=#d6d6d6
| 243450 ||  || — || April 16, 2009 || Catalina || CSS || — || align=right | 4.5 km || 
|-id=451 bgcolor=#E9E9E9
| 243451 ||  || — || April 21, 2009 || Socorro || LINEAR || NEM || align=right | 3.6 km || 
|-id=452 bgcolor=#d6d6d6
| 243452 ||  || — || April 19, 2009 || Kitt Peak || Spacewatch || — || align=right | 6.0 km || 
|-id=453 bgcolor=#C2FFFF
| 243453 ||  || — || April 29, 2009 || Kitt Peak || Spacewatch || L5 || align=right | 15 km || 
|-id=454 bgcolor=#E9E9E9
| 243454 ||  || — || April 29, 2009 || Kitt Peak || Spacewatch || HOF || align=right | 4.2 km || 
|-id=455 bgcolor=#d6d6d6
| 243455 ||  || — || May 12, 2009 || Mayhill || A. Lowe || — || align=right | 2.7 km || 
|-id=456 bgcolor=#d6d6d6
| 243456 ||  || — || May 13, 2009 || Catalina || CSS || — || align=right | 2.7 km || 
|-id=457 bgcolor=#E9E9E9
| 243457 ||  || — || May 3, 2009 || Kitt Peak || Spacewatch || — || align=right | 3.0 km || 
|-id=458 bgcolor=#fefefe
| 243458 Bubulina ||  ||  || August 31, 2009 || Skylive Obs. || F. Tozzi, M. Graziani || CHL || align=right | 2.8 km || 
|-id=459 bgcolor=#fefefe
| 243459 ||  || — || September 12, 2009 || Kitt Peak || Spacewatch || — || align=right | 2.3 km || 
|-id=460 bgcolor=#C2FFFF
| 243460 ||  || — || September 15, 2009 || Kitt Peak || Spacewatch || L4 || align=right | 14 km || 
|-id=461 bgcolor=#fefefe
| 243461 ||  || — || September 17, 2009 || Catalina || CSS || — || align=right | 1.0 km || 
|-id=462 bgcolor=#d6d6d6
| 243462 ||  || — || September 16, 2009 || Kitt Peak || Spacewatch || HYG || align=right | 2.7 km || 
|-id=463 bgcolor=#d6d6d6
| 243463 ||  || — || September 16, 2009 || Kitt Peak || Spacewatch || HYG || align=right | 4.4 km || 
|-id=464 bgcolor=#E9E9E9
| 243464 ||  || — || September 17, 2009 || La Sagra || OAM Obs. || KRM || align=right | 3.8 km || 
|-id=465 bgcolor=#fefefe
| 243465 ||  || — || September 18, 2009 || Catalina || CSS || — || align=right | 2.0 km || 
|-id=466 bgcolor=#d6d6d6
| 243466 ||  || — || September 25, 2009 || Taunus || S. Karge, R. Kling || — || align=right | 6.3 km || 
|-id=467 bgcolor=#d6d6d6
| 243467 ||  || — || September 18, 2009 || Kitt Peak || Spacewatch || — || align=right | 3.8 km || 
|-id=468 bgcolor=#E9E9E9
| 243468 ||  || — || September 19, 2009 || Kitt Peak || Spacewatch || KON || align=right | 2.8 km || 
|-id=469 bgcolor=#d6d6d6
| 243469 ||  || — || September 20, 2009 || Kitt Peak || Spacewatch || — || align=right | 4.8 km || 
|-id=470 bgcolor=#d6d6d6
| 243470 ||  || — || September 19, 2009 || Catalina || CSS || EUP || align=right | 6.1 km || 
|-id=471 bgcolor=#d6d6d6
| 243471 ||  || — || September 23, 2009 || Kitt Peak || Spacewatch || — || align=right | 3.0 km || 
|-id=472 bgcolor=#d6d6d6
| 243472 ||  || — || September 23, 2009 || Kitt Peak || Spacewatch || — || align=right | 3.8 km || 
|-id=473 bgcolor=#d6d6d6
| 243473 ||  || — || September 18, 2009 || Catalina || CSS || EUP || align=right | 3.5 km || 
|-id=474 bgcolor=#E9E9E9
| 243474 ||  || — || September 23, 2009 || Mount Lemmon || Mount Lemmon Survey || — || align=right | 2.9 km || 
|-id=475 bgcolor=#d6d6d6
| 243475 ||  || — || September 23, 2009 || Mount Lemmon || Mount Lemmon Survey || HYG || align=right | 5.2 km || 
|-id=476 bgcolor=#E9E9E9
| 243476 ||  || — || September 25, 2009 || Kitt Peak || Spacewatch || HOF || align=right | 4.2 km || 
|-id=477 bgcolor=#fefefe
| 243477 ||  || — || September 26, 2009 || Kitt Peak || Spacewatch || — || align=right | 1.4 km || 
|-id=478 bgcolor=#d6d6d6
| 243478 ||  || — || September 17, 2009 || Kitt Peak || Spacewatch || — || align=right | 5.1 km || 
|-id=479 bgcolor=#C2FFFF
| 243479 ||  || — || October 11, 2009 || La Sagra || OAM Obs. || L4 || align=right | 11 km || 
|-id=480 bgcolor=#E9E9E9
| 243480 ||  || — || October 14, 2009 || Bisei SG Center || BATTeRS || NEM || align=right | 2.7 km || 
|-id=481 bgcolor=#d6d6d6
| 243481 ||  || — || October 14, 2009 || La Sagra || OAM Obs. || — || align=right | 2.8 km || 
|-id=482 bgcolor=#d6d6d6
| 243482 ||  || — || October 12, 2009 || La Sagra || OAM Obs. || — || align=right | 3.4 km || 
|-id=483 bgcolor=#d6d6d6
| 243483 ||  || — || October 15, 2009 || Catalina || CSS || — || align=right | 5.1 km || 
|-id=484 bgcolor=#C2FFFF
| 243484 ||  || — || October 14, 2009 || La Sagra || OAM Obs. || L4 || align=right | 13 km || 
|-id=485 bgcolor=#d6d6d6
| 243485 ||  || — || October 14, 2009 || Purple Mountain || PMO NEO || — || align=right | 5.7 km || 
|-id=486 bgcolor=#d6d6d6
| 243486 ||  || — || October 12, 2009 || La Sagra || OAM Obs. || — || align=right | 6.4 km || 
|-id=487 bgcolor=#E9E9E9
| 243487 ||  || — || October 14, 2009 || Catalina || CSS || — || align=right | 4.5 km || 
|-id=488 bgcolor=#d6d6d6
| 243488 ||  || — || October 14, 2009 || Purple Mountain || PMO NEO || — || align=right | 3.8 km || 
|-id=489 bgcolor=#d6d6d6
| 243489 ||  || — || October 16, 2009 || Catalina || CSS || ALA || align=right | 5.3 km || 
|-id=490 bgcolor=#C2FFFF
| 243490 ||  || — || October 23, 2009 || Mayhill || iTelescope Obs. || L4 || align=right | 19 km || 
|-id=491 bgcolor=#fefefe
| 243491 Mühlviertel ||  ||  || October 20, 2009 || Linz || D. Voglsam || — || align=right | 2.7 km || 
|-id=492 bgcolor=#E9E9E9
| 243492 ||  || — || October 21, 2009 || Catalina || CSS || — || align=right | 3.2 km || 
|-id=493 bgcolor=#E9E9E9
| 243493 ||  || — || October 22, 2009 || Mount Lemmon || Mount Lemmon Survey || — || align=right | 2.1 km || 
|-id=494 bgcolor=#C2FFFF
| 243494 ||  || — || October 21, 2009 || Mount Lemmon || Mount Lemmon Survey || L4 || align=right | 11 km || 
|-id=495 bgcolor=#E9E9E9
| 243495 ||  || — || October 24, 2009 || Catalina || CSS || — || align=right | 3.3 km || 
|-id=496 bgcolor=#C2FFFF
| 243496 ||  || — || October 21, 2009 || Mount Lemmon || Mount Lemmon Survey || L4 || align=right | 15 km || 
|-id=497 bgcolor=#d6d6d6
| 243497 ||  || — || October 26, 2009 || Mount Lemmon || Mount Lemmon Survey || — || align=right | 3.6 km || 
|-id=498 bgcolor=#d6d6d6
| 243498 ||  || — || October 26, 2009 || Catalina || CSS || — || align=right | 5.1 km || 
|-id=499 bgcolor=#C2FFFF
| 243499 ||  || — || October 30, 2009 || Mount Lemmon || Mount Lemmon Survey || L4 || align=right | 13 km || 
|-id=500 bgcolor=#d6d6d6
| 243500 ||  || — || October 27, 2009 || Mount Lemmon || Mount Lemmon Survey || VER || align=right | 4.4 km || 
|}

243501–243600 

|-bgcolor=#C2FFFF
| 243501 ||  || — || October 24, 2009 || Mount Lemmon || Mount Lemmon Survey || L4 || align=right | 15 km || 
|-id=502 bgcolor=#d6d6d6
| 243502 ||  || — || October 25, 2009 || Kitt Peak || Spacewatch || HYG || align=right | 3.0 km || 
|-id=503 bgcolor=#d6d6d6
| 243503 ||  || — || November 8, 2009 || Kitt Peak || Spacewatch || — || align=right | 4.2 km || 
|-id=504 bgcolor=#C2FFFF
| 243504 ||  || — || November 8, 2009 || Catalina || CSS || L4 || align=right | 12 km || 
|-id=505 bgcolor=#E9E9E9
| 243505 ||  || — || November 9, 2009 || Catalina || CSS || — || align=right | 2.4 km || 
|-id=506 bgcolor=#d6d6d6
| 243506 || 2009 WS || — || November 16, 2009 || Calvin-Rehoboth || L. A. Molnar || — || align=right | 3.5 km || 
|-id=507 bgcolor=#d6d6d6
| 243507 ||  || — || November 16, 2009 || Kitt Peak || Spacewatch || — || align=right | 2.7 km || 
|-id=508 bgcolor=#fefefe
| 243508 ||  || — || November 18, 2009 || Kitt Peak || Spacewatch || — || align=right | 1.7 km || 
|-id=509 bgcolor=#C2FFFF
| 243509 ||  || — || November 18, 2009 || Kitt Peak || Spacewatch || L4 || align=right | 11 km || 
|-id=510 bgcolor=#d6d6d6
| 243510 ||  || — || November 19, 2009 || Kitt Peak || Spacewatch || HYG || align=right | 2.6 km || 
|-id=511 bgcolor=#E9E9E9
| 243511 ||  || — || November 20, 2009 || Mount Lemmon || Mount Lemmon Survey || KRM || align=right | 3.2 km || 
|-id=512 bgcolor=#d6d6d6
| 243512 ||  || — || December 17, 2009 || Kitt Peak || Spacewatch || — || align=right | 3.2 km || 
|-id=513 bgcolor=#E9E9E9
| 243513 ||  || — || December 18, 2009 || Kitt Peak || Spacewatch || — || align=right | 4.1 km || 
|-id=514 bgcolor=#d6d6d6
| 243514 ||  || — || January 11, 2010 || Kitt Peak || Spacewatch || HYG || align=right | 4.4 km || 
|-id=515 bgcolor=#d6d6d6
| 243515 ||  || — || January 11, 2010 || Kitt Peak || Spacewatch || EOS || align=right | 2.8 km || 
|-id=516 bgcolor=#E9E9E9
| 243516 Marklarsen ||  ||  || February 6, 2010 || WISE || WISE || — || align=right | 3.7 km || 
|-id=517 bgcolor=#d6d6d6
| 243517 ||  || — || February 9, 2010 || Kitt Peak || Spacewatch || — || align=right | 4.5 km || 
|-id=518 bgcolor=#E9E9E9
| 243518 ||  || — || February 10, 2010 || Kitt Peak || Spacewatch || XIZ || align=right | 2.3 km || 
|-id=519 bgcolor=#d6d6d6
| 243519 ||  || — || February 10, 2010 || Kitt Peak || Spacewatch || — || align=right | 3.4 km || 
|-id=520 bgcolor=#d6d6d6
| 243520 ||  || — || February 14, 2010 || Calvin-Rehoboth || Calvin–Rehoboth Obs. || — || align=right | 2.8 km || 
|-id=521 bgcolor=#d6d6d6
| 243521 ||  || — || February 9, 2010 || Kitt Peak || Spacewatch || — || align=right | 3.8 km || 
|-id=522 bgcolor=#E9E9E9
| 243522 ||  || — || February 15, 2010 || Catalina || CSS || INO || align=right | 2.3 km || 
|-id=523 bgcolor=#E9E9E9
| 243523 ||  || — || February 13, 2010 || Kitt Peak || Spacewatch || DOR || align=right | 3.8 km || 
|-id=524 bgcolor=#d6d6d6
| 243524 ||  || — || February 16, 2010 || Kitt Peak || Spacewatch || — || align=right | 3.4 km || 
|-id=525 bgcolor=#d6d6d6
| 243525 ||  || — || February 16, 2010 || Kitt Peak || Spacewatch || 7:4 || align=right | 6.4 km || 
|-id=526 bgcolor=#d6d6d6
| 243526 Russwalker ||  ||  || February 19, 2010 || WISE || WISE || TIR || align=right | 5.5 km || 
|-id=527 bgcolor=#E9E9E9
| 243527 ||  || — || February 17, 2010 || Kitt Peak || Spacewatch || — || align=right | 2.8 km || 
|-id=528 bgcolor=#E9E9E9
| 243528 ||  || — || February 17, 2010 || Kitt Peak || Spacewatch || — || align=right | 2.0 km || 
|-id=529 bgcolor=#d6d6d6
| 243529 Petereisenhardt ||  ||  || February 20, 2010 || WISE || WISE || ALA || align=right | 5.4 km || 
|-id=530 bgcolor=#E9E9E9
| 243530 ||  || — || February 17, 2010 || Siding Spring || SSS || — || align=right | 4.4 km || 
|-id=531 bgcolor=#d6d6d6
| 243531 ||  || — || March 5, 2010 || Catalina || CSS || ALA || align=right | 5.6 km || 
|-id=532 bgcolor=#fefefe
| 243532 ||  || — || March 5, 2010 || Catalina || CSS || — || align=right | 3.0 km || 
|-id=533 bgcolor=#d6d6d6
| 243533 ||  || — || March 5, 2010 || Kitt Peak || Spacewatch || — || align=right | 3.6 km || 
|-id=534 bgcolor=#E9E9E9
| 243534 ||  || — || March 12, 2010 || Catalina || CSS || — || align=right | 2.4 km || 
|-id=535 bgcolor=#E9E9E9
| 243535 ||  || — || March 13, 2010 || Mount Lemmon || Mount Lemmon Survey || — || align=right | 2.1 km || 
|-id=536 bgcolor=#d6d6d6
| 243536 Mannheim ||  ||  || March 15, 2010 || Moorook || E. Schwab || — || align=right | 3.5 km || 
|-id=537 bgcolor=#E9E9E9
| 243537 ||  || — || March 13, 2010 || Kitt Peak || Spacewatch || — || align=right | 3.4 km || 
|-id=538 bgcolor=#d6d6d6
| 243538 ||  || — || March 18, 2010 || Mount Lemmon || Mount Lemmon Survey || — || align=right | 5.5 km || 
|-id=539 bgcolor=#fefefe
| 243539 ||  || — || March 19, 2010 || Kitt Peak || Spacewatch || NYS || align=right | 2.1 km || 
|-id=540 bgcolor=#d6d6d6
| 243540 ||  || — || April 7, 2010 || Catalina || CSS || — || align=right | 3.0 km || 
|-id=541 bgcolor=#fefefe
| 243541 ||  || — || April 11, 2010 || Mount Lemmon || Mount Lemmon Survey || — || align=right | 2.6 km || 
|-id=542 bgcolor=#fefefe
| 243542 ||  || — || May 3, 2010 || Kitt Peak || Spacewatch || — || align=right | 1.8 km || 
|-id=543 bgcolor=#d6d6d6
| 243543 ||  || — || May 2, 2010 || Kitt Peak || Spacewatch || — || align=right | 3.1 km || 
|-id=544 bgcolor=#E9E9E9
| 243544 ||  || — || May 2, 2010 || Kitt Peak || Spacewatch || — || align=right | 1.5 km || 
|-id=545 bgcolor=#fefefe
| 243545 ||  || — || May 3, 2010 || Kitt Peak || Spacewatch || KLI || align=right | 1.9 km || 
|-id=546 bgcolor=#d6d6d6
| 243546 Fengchuanliu ||  ||  || May 8, 2010 || WISE || WISE || — || align=right | 4.4 km || 
|-id=547 bgcolor=#E9E9E9
| 243547 ||  || — || May 3, 2010 || Kitt Peak || Spacewatch || — || align=right | 1.8 km || 
|-id=548 bgcolor=#E9E9E9
| 243548 ||  || — || May 8, 2010 || Mount Lemmon || Mount Lemmon Survey || — || align=right | 2.2 km || 
|-id=549 bgcolor=#d6d6d6
| 243549 ||  || — || May 14, 2010 || Mount Lemmon || Mount Lemmon Survey || — || align=right | 2.5 km || 
|-id=550 bgcolor=#d6d6d6
| 243550 || 1240 T-2 || — || September 29, 1973 || Palomar || PLS || — || align=right | 6.9 km || 
|-id=551 bgcolor=#d6d6d6
| 243551 || 3266 T-3 || — || October 16, 1977 || Palomar || PLS || — || align=right | 2.7 km || 
|-id=552 bgcolor=#d6d6d6
| 243552 || 4514 T-3 || — || October 16, 1977 || Palomar || PLS || — || align=right | 5.1 km || 
|-id=553 bgcolor=#d6d6d6
| 243553 || 5066 T-3 || — || October 16, 1977 || Palomar || PLS || — || align=right | 3.4 km || 
|-id=554 bgcolor=#d6d6d6
| 243554 ||  || — || March 2, 1981 || Siding Spring || S. J. Bus || — || align=right | 5.6 km || 
|-id=555 bgcolor=#d6d6d6
| 243555 ||  || — || November 4, 1991 || Kitt Peak || Spacewatch || EOS || align=right | 2.4 km || 
|-id=556 bgcolor=#d6d6d6
| 243556 ||  || — || April 20, 1993 || Kitt Peak || Spacewatch || — || align=right | 5.2 km || 
|-id=557 bgcolor=#fefefe
| 243557 ||  || — || April 20, 1993 || Kitt Peak || Spacewatch || V || align=right data-sort-value="0.83" | 830 m || 
|-id=558 bgcolor=#E9E9E9
| 243558 ||  || — || October 9, 1993 || La Silla || E. W. Elst || — || align=right | 1.8 km || 
|-id=559 bgcolor=#fefefe
| 243559 ||  || — || October 9, 1993 || La Silla || E. W. Elst || — || align=right | 2.1 km || 
|-id=560 bgcolor=#E9E9E9
| 243560 ||  || — || August 10, 1994 || La Silla || E. W. Elst || EUN || align=right | 2.5 km || 
|-id=561 bgcolor=#E9E9E9
| 243561 ||  || — || December 31, 1994 || Kitt Peak || Spacewatch || — || align=right | 1.6 km || 
|-id=562 bgcolor=#d6d6d6
| 243562 ||  || — || January 29, 1995 || Kitt Peak || Spacewatch || — || align=right | 4.9 km || 
|-id=563 bgcolor=#fefefe
| 243563 ||  || — || March 27, 1995 || Kitt Peak || Spacewatch || NYS || align=right data-sort-value="0.69" | 690 m || 
|-id=564 bgcolor=#fefefe
| 243564 ||  || — || June 29, 1995 || Kitt Peak || Spacewatch || — || align=right data-sort-value="0.80" | 800 m || 
|-id=565 bgcolor=#d6d6d6
| 243565 ||  || — || July 25, 1995 || Kitt Peak || Spacewatch || — || align=right | 5.6 km || 
|-id=566 bgcolor=#FFC2E0
| 243566 || 1995 SA || — || September 17, 1995 || Kitt Peak || Spacewatch || APO +1kmPHA || align=right data-sort-value="0.88" | 880 m || 
|-id=567 bgcolor=#d6d6d6
| 243567 ||  || — || September 19, 1995 || Kitt Peak || Spacewatch || — || align=right | 3.7 km || 
|-id=568 bgcolor=#d6d6d6
| 243568 ||  || — || September 26, 1995 || Kitt Peak || Spacewatch || EOS || align=right | 2.2 km || 
|-id=569 bgcolor=#E9E9E9
| 243569 ||  || — || December 14, 1995 || Kitt Peak || Spacewatch || GEF || align=right | 2.3 km || 
|-id=570 bgcolor=#E9E9E9
| 243570 ||  || — || December 14, 1995 || Kitt Peak || Spacewatch || — || align=right | 1.5 km || 
|-id=571 bgcolor=#E9E9E9
| 243571 ||  || — || January 12, 1996 || Kitt Peak || Spacewatch || — || align=right | 1.8 km || 
|-id=572 bgcolor=#fefefe
| 243572 ||  || — || April 13, 1996 || Kitt Peak || Spacewatch || NYS || align=right | 2.4 km || 
|-id=573 bgcolor=#fefefe
| 243573 ||  || — || June 8, 1996 || Kitt Peak || Spacewatch || V || align=right data-sort-value="0.76" | 760 m || 
|-id=574 bgcolor=#E9E9E9
| 243574 ||  || — || September 5, 1996 || Kitt Peak || Spacewatch || HOF || align=right | 2.8 km || 
|-id=575 bgcolor=#d6d6d6
| 243575 ||  || — || November 6, 1996 || Kitt Peak || Spacewatch || — || align=right | 3.0 km || 
|-id=576 bgcolor=#d6d6d6
| 243576 ||  || — || November 7, 1996 || Xinglong || SCAP || — || align=right | 3.9 km || 
|-id=577 bgcolor=#fefefe
| 243577 || 1996 WE || — || November 16, 1996 || Sudbury || D. di Cicco || — || align=right | 1.9 km || 
|-id=578 bgcolor=#d6d6d6
| 243578 ||  || — || December 6, 1996 || Kitt Peak || Spacewatch || — || align=right | 4.6 km || 
|-id=579 bgcolor=#fefefe
| 243579 ||  || — || July 9, 1997 || Kitt Peak || Spacewatch || FLO || align=right | 1.4 km || 
|-id=580 bgcolor=#E9E9E9
| 243580 ||  || — || August 5, 1997 || Majorca || Á. López J., R. Pacheco || BAR || align=right | 1.5 km || 
|-id=581 bgcolor=#fefefe
| 243581 ||  || — || September 7, 1997 || Caussols || ODAS || — || align=right data-sort-value="0.81" | 810 m || 
|-id=582 bgcolor=#fefefe
| 243582 ||  || — || September 23, 1997 || Kitt Peak || Spacewatch || V || align=right data-sort-value="0.71" | 710 m || 
|-id=583 bgcolor=#fefefe
| 243583 ||  || — || October 2, 1997 || Kitt Peak || Spacewatch || V || align=right data-sort-value="0.68" | 680 m || 
|-id=584 bgcolor=#E9E9E9
| 243584 ||  || — || October 4, 1997 || Kitt Peak || Spacewatch || MIS || align=right | 2.7 km || 
|-id=585 bgcolor=#fefefe
| 243585 ||  || — || November 29, 1997 || Kitt Peak || Spacewatch || — || align=right | 1.1 km || 
|-id=586 bgcolor=#fefefe
| 243586 ||  || — || December 21, 1997 || Kitt Peak || Spacewatch || V || align=right | 1.2 km || 
|-id=587 bgcolor=#FA8072
| 243587 ||  || — || February 22, 1998 || Haleakala || NEAT || — || align=right data-sort-value="0.68" | 680 m || 
|-id=588 bgcolor=#d6d6d6
| 243588 ||  || — || June 19, 1998 || Kitt Peak || Spacewatch || — || align=right | 5.5 km || 
|-id=589 bgcolor=#E9E9E9
| 243589 ||  || — || August 17, 1998 || Socorro || LINEAR || — || align=right | 2.7 km || 
|-id=590 bgcolor=#E9E9E9
| 243590 ||  || — || August 24, 1998 || Socorro || LINEAR || — || align=right | 2.2 km || 
|-id=591 bgcolor=#E9E9E9
| 243591 Ignacostantino ||  ||  || September 15, 1998 || Colleverde || V. S. Casulli || — || align=right | 2.6 km || 
|-id=592 bgcolor=#d6d6d6
| 243592 ||  || — || September 14, 1998 || Socorro || LINEAR || — || align=right | 5.2 km || 
|-id=593 bgcolor=#E9E9E9
| 243593 ||  || — || September 13, 1998 || Kitt Peak || Spacewatch || — || align=right | 1.7 km || 
|-id=594 bgcolor=#E9E9E9
| 243594 ||  || — || September 14, 1998 || Socorro || LINEAR || — || align=right | 2.0 km || 
|-id=595 bgcolor=#E9E9E9
| 243595 ||  || — || September 14, 1998 || Socorro || LINEAR || — || align=right | 1.7 km || 
|-id=596 bgcolor=#E9E9E9
| 243596 ||  || — || September 26, 1998 || Socorro || LINEAR || TIN || align=right | 1.8 km || 
|-id=597 bgcolor=#E9E9E9
| 243597 ||  || — || September 26, 1998 || Socorro || LINEAR || — || align=right | 1.9 km || 
|-id=598 bgcolor=#E9E9E9
| 243598 ||  || — || September 26, 1998 || Socorro || LINEAR || EUN || align=right | 1.7 km || 
|-id=599 bgcolor=#E9E9E9
| 243599 ||  || — || September 26, 1998 || Socorro || LINEAR || — || align=right | 1.2 km || 
|-id=600 bgcolor=#E9E9E9
| 243600 ||  || — || September 26, 1998 || Socorro || LINEAR || — || align=right | 1.4 km || 
|}

243601–243700 

|-bgcolor=#fefefe
| 243601 ||  || — || September 17, 1998 || Anderson Mesa || LONEOS || — || align=right | 1.1 km || 
|-id=602 bgcolor=#fefefe
| 243602 ||  || — || October 16, 1998 || Kitt Peak || Spacewatch || — || align=right data-sort-value="0.87" | 870 m || 
|-id=603 bgcolor=#fefefe
| 243603 ||  || — || November 15, 1998 || Kitt Peak || Spacewatch || NYS || align=right data-sort-value="0.60" | 600 m || 
|-id=604 bgcolor=#E9E9E9
| 243604 ||  || — || November 16, 1998 || Kitt Peak || Spacewatch || — || align=right | 1.8 km || 
|-id=605 bgcolor=#E9E9E9
| 243605 ||  || — || November 23, 1998 || Kitt Peak || Spacewatch || HEN || align=right | 1.2 km || 
|-id=606 bgcolor=#E9E9E9
| 243606 ||  || — || November 21, 1998 || Kitt Peak || Spacewatch || — || align=right | 2.5 km || 
|-id=607 bgcolor=#E9E9E9
| 243607 ||  || — || November 19, 1998 || Caussols || ODAS || — || align=right | 2.6 km || 
|-id=608 bgcolor=#fefefe
| 243608 ||  || — || December 11, 1998 || Kitt Peak || Spacewatch || FLO || align=right data-sort-value="0.77" | 770 m || 
|-id=609 bgcolor=#E9E9E9
| 243609 ||  || — || December 26, 1998 || Oizumi || T. Kobayashi || — || align=right | 4.3 km || 
|-id=610 bgcolor=#E9E9E9
| 243610 ||  || — || December 19, 1998 || Kitt Peak || Spacewatch || — || align=right | 2.3 km || 
|-id=611 bgcolor=#E9E9E9
| 243611 ||  || — || January 8, 1999 || Kitt Peak || Spacewatch || — || align=right | 3.4 km || 
|-id=612 bgcolor=#fefefe
| 243612 ||  || — || January 16, 1999 || Kitt Peak || Spacewatch || — || align=right data-sort-value="0.69" | 690 m || 
|-id=613 bgcolor=#fefefe
| 243613 ||  || — || February 12, 1999 || Socorro || LINEAR || — || align=right | 1.7 km || 
|-id=614 bgcolor=#fefefe
| 243614 ||  || — || February 8, 1999 || Kitt Peak || Spacewatch || — || align=right | 1.1 km || 
|-id=615 bgcolor=#d6d6d6
| 243615 ||  || — || March 16, 1999 || Kitt Peak || Spacewatch || — || align=right | 3.4 km || 
|-id=616 bgcolor=#d6d6d6
| 243616 ||  || — || March 20, 1999 || Apache Point || SDSS || — || align=right | 4.2 km || 
|-id=617 bgcolor=#d6d6d6
| 243617 ||  || — || April 6, 1999 || Kitt Peak || Spacewatch || — || align=right | 2.7 km || 
|-id=618 bgcolor=#FA8072
| 243618 ||  || — || May 10, 1999 || Socorro || LINEAR || — || align=right | 1.8 km || 
|-id=619 bgcolor=#fefefe
| 243619 ||  || — || May 18, 1999 || Socorro || LINEAR || KLI || align=right | 3.2 km || 
|-id=620 bgcolor=#d6d6d6
| 243620 ||  || — || June 8, 1999 || Socorro || LINEAR || — || align=right | 4.3 km || 
|-id=621 bgcolor=#d6d6d6
| 243621 ||  || — || September 7, 1999 || Socorro || LINEAR || EUP || align=right | 6.0 km || 
|-id=622 bgcolor=#d6d6d6
| 243622 ||  || — || September 7, 1999 || Socorro || LINEAR || EOS || align=right | 3.2 km || 
|-id=623 bgcolor=#fefefe
| 243623 ||  || — || September 7, 1999 || Socorro || LINEAR || NYS || align=right data-sort-value="0.99" | 990 m || 
|-id=624 bgcolor=#E9E9E9
| 243624 ||  || — || September 12, 1999 || Monte Agliale || M. M. M. Santangelo || — || align=right | 2.9 km || 
|-id=625 bgcolor=#E9E9E9
| 243625 ||  || — || September 7, 1999 || Socorro || LINEAR || — || align=right | 2.7 km || 
|-id=626 bgcolor=#d6d6d6
| 243626 ||  || — || September 9, 1999 || Socorro || LINEAR || — || align=right | 3.7 km || 
|-id=627 bgcolor=#d6d6d6
| 243627 ||  || — || September 9, 1999 || Socorro || LINEAR || — || align=right | 5.9 km || 
|-id=628 bgcolor=#d6d6d6
| 243628 ||  || — || September 9, 1999 || Socorro || LINEAR || — || align=right | 5.1 km || 
|-id=629 bgcolor=#E9E9E9
| 243629 ||  || — || September 8, 1999 || Socorro || LINEAR || — || align=right | 2.9 km || 
|-id=630 bgcolor=#d6d6d6
| 243630 ||  || — || September 8, 1999 || Socorro || LINEAR || — || align=right | 2.5 km || 
|-id=631 bgcolor=#d6d6d6
| 243631 ||  || — || September 8, 1999 || Socorro || LINEAR || — || align=right | 4.8 km || 
|-id=632 bgcolor=#E9E9E9
| 243632 ||  || — || September 8, 1999 || Socorro || LINEAR || BRU || align=right | 4.2 km || 
|-id=633 bgcolor=#d6d6d6
| 243633 ||  || — || September 8, 1999 || Socorro || LINEAR || EUP || align=right | 6.7 km || 
|-id=634 bgcolor=#d6d6d6
| 243634 ||  || — || September 27, 1999 || Socorro || LINEAR || EUP || align=right | 6.8 km || 
|-id=635 bgcolor=#d6d6d6
| 243635 ||  || — || September 29, 1999 || Catalina || CSS || TIR || align=right | 2.7 km || 
|-id=636 bgcolor=#fefefe
| 243636 ||  || — || September 30, 1999 || Catalina || CSS || — || align=right | 2.0 km || 
|-id=637 bgcolor=#fefefe
| 243637 Frosinone ||  ||  || October 8, 1999 || Ceccano || G. Masi || — || align=right | 1.5 km || 
|-id=638 bgcolor=#E9E9E9
| 243638 ||  || — || October 3, 1999 || Socorro || LINEAR || — || align=right | 3.0 km || 
|-id=639 bgcolor=#d6d6d6
| 243639 ||  || — || October 4, 1999 || Kitt Peak || Spacewatch || — || align=right | 4.4 km || 
|-id=640 bgcolor=#E9E9E9
| 243640 ||  || — || October 6, 1999 || Kitt Peak || Spacewatch || — || align=right | 1.4 km || 
|-id=641 bgcolor=#E9E9E9
| 243641 ||  || — || October 7, 1999 || Kitt Peak || Spacewatch || — || align=right | 1.7 km || 
|-id=642 bgcolor=#fefefe
| 243642 ||  || — || October 2, 1999 || Socorro || LINEAR || — || align=right | 2.5 km || 
|-id=643 bgcolor=#E9E9E9
| 243643 ||  || — || October 4, 1999 || Socorro || LINEAR || ADE || align=right | 4.1 km || 
|-id=644 bgcolor=#d6d6d6
| 243644 ||  || — || October 6, 1999 || Socorro || LINEAR || EUP || align=right | 5.3 km || 
|-id=645 bgcolor=#E9E9E9
| 243645 ||  || — || October 6, 1999 || Socorro || LINEAR || WIT || align=right | 1.4 km || 
|-id=646 bgcolor=#fefefe
| 243646 ||  || — || October 7, 1999 || Socorro || LINEAR || — || align=right | 1.3 km || 
|-id=647 bgcolor=#E9E9E9
| 243647 ||  || — || October 7, 1999 || Socorro || LINEAR || — || align=right | 1.5 km || 
|-id=648 bgcolor=#fefefe
| 243648 ||  || — || October 10, 1999 || Socorro || LINEAR || — || align=right | 2.6 km || 
|-id=649 bgcolor=#d6d6d6
| 243649 ||  || — || October 12, 1999 || Socorro || LINEAR || — || align=right | 3.3 km || 
|-id=650 bgcolor=#d6d6d6
| 243650 ||  || — || October 4, 1999 || Catalina || CSS || TIR || align=right | 3.4 km || 
|-id=651 bgcolor=#E9E9E9
| 243651 ||  || — || October 11, 1999 || Socorro || LINEAR || — || align=right | 1.2 km || 
|-id=652 bgcolor=#E9E9E9
| 243652 ||  || — || October 13, 1999 || Kitt Peak || Spacewatch || — || align=right | 2.1 km || 
|-id=653 bgcolor=#d6d6d6
| 243653 ||  || — || October 3, 1999 || Socorro || LINEAR || — || align=right | 5.3 km || 
|-id=654 bgcolor=#E9E9E9
| 243654 ||  || — || October 10, 1999 || Socorro || LINEAR || — || align=right | 2.6 km || 
|-id=655 bgcolor=#E9E9E9
| 243655 ||  || — || October 29, 1999 || Catalina || CSS || — || align=right | 1.4 km || 
|-id=656 bgcolor=#fefefe
| 243656 ||  || — || October 28, 1999 || Catalina || CSS || — || align=right | 2.2 km || 
|-id=657 bgcolor=#fefefe
| 243657 ||  || — || October 31, 1999 || Catalina || CSS || — || align=right | 3.6 km || 
|-id=658 bgcolor=#d6d6d6
| 243658 ||  || — || October 31, 1999 || Catalina || CSS || — || align=right | 5.2 km || 
|-id=659 bgcolor=#E9E9E9
| 243659 ||  || — || October 31, 1999 || Catalina || CSS || — || align=right | 1.8 km || 
|-id=660 bgcolor=#FA8072
| 243660 ||  || — || November 2, 1999 || Socorro || LINEAR || — || align=right | 1.5 km || 
|-id=661 bgcolor=#E9E9E9
| 243661 ||  || — || November 2, 1999 || Socorro || LINEAR || — || align=right | 4.6 km || 
|-id=662 bgcolor=#E9E9E9
| 243662 ||  || — || November 15, 1999 || Eskridge || Farpoint Obs. || ADE || align=right | 4.2 km || 
|-id=663 bgcolor=#E9E9E9
| 243663 ||  || — || November 5, 1999 || Kitt Peak || Spacewatch || — || align=right | 2.1 km || 
|-id=664 bgcolor=#E9E9E9
| 243664 ||  || — || November 4, 1999 || Socorro || LINEAR || BRU || align=right | 3.0 km || 
|-id=665 bgcolor=#fefefe
| 243665 ||  || — || November 4, 1999 || Socorro || LINEAR || ERI || align=right | 2.5 km || 
|-id=666 bgcolor=#d6d6d6
| 243666 ||  || — || November 2, 1999 || Kitt Peak || Spacewatch || — || align=right | 3.5 km || 
|-id=667 bgcolor=#E9E9E9
| 243667 ||  || — || November 6, 1999 || Kitt Peak || Spacewatch || — || align=right | 2.5 km || 
|-id=668 bgcolor=#d6d6d6
| 243668 ||  || — || November 6, 1999 || Kitt Peak || Spacewatch || VER || align=right | 3.5 km || 
|-id=669 bgcolor=#d6d6d6
| 243669 ||  || — || November 9, 1999 || Socorro || LINEAR || HYG || align=right | 5.5 km || 
|-id=670 bgcolor=#E9E9E9
| 243670 ||  || — || November 9, 1999 || Kitt Peak || Spacewatch || — || align=right | 1.5 km || 
|-id=671 bgcolor=#fefefe
| 243671 ||  || — || November 14, 1999 || Socorro || LINEAR || NYS || align=right | 1.0 km || 
|-id=672 bgcolor=#E9E9E9
| 243672 ||  || — || November 14, 1999 || Socorro || LINEAR || — || align=right | 1.4 km || 
|-id=673 bgcolor=#d6d6d6
| 243673 ||  || — || November 1, 1999 || Anderson Mesa || LONEOS || THB || align=right | 4.9 km || 
|-id=674 bgcolor=#E9E9E9
| 243674 ||  || — || November 4, 1999 || Anderson Mesa || LONEOS || MIT || align=right | 4.3 km || 
|-id=675 bgcolor=#d6d6d6
| 243675 ||  || — || November 11, 1999 || Kitt Peak || Spacewatch || — || align=right | 5.1 km || 
|-id=676 bgcolor=#E9E9E9
| 243676 ||  || — || November 28, 1999 || Kitt Peak || Spacewatch || — || align=right | 3.0 km || 
|-id=677 bgcolor=#E9E9E9
| 243677 ||  || — || November 29, 1999 || Kitt Peak || Spacewatch || — || align=right | 1.3 km || 
|-id=678 bgcolor=#E9E9E9
| 243678 ||  || — || November 16, 1999 || Socorro || LINEAR || — || align=right | 5.3 km || 
|-id=679 bgcolor=#E9E9E9
| 243679 ||  || — || December 6, 1999 || Socorro || LINEAR || JUN || align=right | 1.6 km || 
|-id=680 bgcolor=#fefefe
| 243680 ||  || — || December 7, 1999 || Socorro || LINEAR || — || align=right | 1.6 km || 
|-id=681 bgcolor=#E9E9E9
| 243681 ||  || — || December 7, 1999 || Socorro || LINEAR || — || align=right | 3.8 km || 
|-id=682 bgcolor=#E9E9E9
| 243682 ||  || — || December 7, 1999 || Socorro || LINEAR || — || align=right | 2.4 km || 
|-id=683 bgcolor=#E9E9E9
| 243683 ||  || — || December 7, 1999 || Socorro || LINEAR || — || align=right | 3.4 km || 
|-id=684 bgcolor=#E9E9E9
| 243684 ||  || — || December 6, 1999 || Socorro || LINEAR || GAL || align=right | 2.6 km || 
|-id=685 bgcolor=#d6d6d6
| 243685 ||  || — || December 6, 1999 || Socorro || LINEAR || Tj (2.97) || align=right | 4.4 km || 
|-id=686 bgcolor=#d6d6d6
| 243686 ||  || — || December 2, 1999 || Kitt Peak || Spacewatch || — || align=right | 2.1 km || 
|-id=687 bgcolor=#E9E9E9
| 243687 ||  || — || December 7, 1999 || Kitt Peak || Spacewatch || — || align=right | 2.2 km || 
|-id=688 bgcolor=#E9E9E9
| 243688 ||  || — || December 10, 1999 || Socorro || LINEAR || — || align=right | 2.9 km || 
|-id=689 bgcolor=#E9E9E9
| 243689 ||  || — || December 10, 1999 || Socorro || LINEAR || — || align=right | 2.4 km || 
|-id=690 bgcolor=#E9E9E9
| 243690 ||  || — || December 15, 1999 || Kitt Peak || Spacewatch || — || align=right | 3.3 km || 
|-id=691 bgcolor=#E9E9E9
| 243691 ||  || — || December 27, 1999 || Kitt Peak || Spacewatch || — || align=right | 2.5 km || 
|-id=692 bgcolor=#E9E9E9
| 243692 ||  || — || December 31, 1999 || Kitt Peak || Spacewatch || — || align=right | 1.3 km || 
|-id=693 bgcolor=#E9E9E9
| 243693 ||  || — || January 5, 2000 || Socorro || LINEAR || BRU || align=right | 5.4 km || 
|-id=694 bgcolor=#E9E9E9
| 243694 ||  || — || January 5, 2000 || Kitt Peak || Spacewatch || — || align=right | 1.8 km || 
|-id=695 bgcolor=#E9E9E9
| 243695 ||  || — || January 5, 2000 || Socorro || LINEAR || — || align=right | 2.5 km || 
|-id=696 bgcolor=#E9E9E9
| 243696 ||  || — || January 5, 2000 || Socorro || LINEAR || — || align=right | 1.8 km || 
|-id=697 bgcolor=#d6d6d6
| 243697 ||  || — || January 27, 2000 || Kitt Peak || Spacewatch || — || align=right | 6.2 km || 
|-id=698 bgcolor=#E9E9E9
| 243698 ||  || — || January 27, 2000 || Socorro || LINEAR || — || align=right | 2.2 km || 
|-id=699 bgcolor=#E9E9E9
| 243699 ||  || — || January 29, 2000 || Kitt Peak || Spacewatch || — || align=right | 3.6 km || 
|-id=700 bgcolor=#E9E9E9
| 243700 ||  || — || January 30, 2000 || Kitt Peak || Spacewatch || — || align=right | 3.8 km || 
|}

243701–243800 

|-bgcolor=#E9E9E9
| 243701 ||  || — || February 2, 2000 || Socorro || LINEAR || — || align=right | 1.6 km || 
|-id=702 bgcolor=#E9E9E9
| 243702 ||  || — || February 2, 2000 || Socorro || LINEAR || — || align=right | 1.5 km || 
|-id=703 bgcolor=#E9E9E9
| 243703 ||  || — || February 5, 2000 || Socorro || LINEAR || — || align=right | 4.2 km || 
|-id=704 bgcolor=#E9E9E9
| 243704 ||  || — || February 3, 2000 || Socorro || LINEAR || — || align=right | 3.1 km || 
|-id=705 bgcolor=#d6d6d6
| 243705 ||  || — || February 4, 2000 || Socorro || LINEAR || TIR || align=right | 4.5 km || 
|-id=706 bgcolor=#E9E9E9
| 243706 ||  || — || February 8, 2000 || Kitt Peak || Spacewatch || HOF || align=right | 2.8 km || 
|-id=707 bgcolor=#E9E9E9
| 243707 ||  || — || February 8, 2000 || Kitt Peak || Spacewatch || HOF || align=right | 2.7 km || 
|-id=708 bgcolor=#fefefe
| 243708 ||  || — || February 29, 2000 || Socorro || LINEAR || — || align=right data-sort-value="0.88" | 880 m || 
|-id=709 bgcolor=#fefefe
| 243709 ||  || — || March 3, 2000 || Socorro || LINEAR || — || align=right | 1.1 km || 
|-id=710 bgcolor=#d6d6d6
| 243710 ||  || — || March 11, 2000 || Socorro || LINEAR || — || align=right | 6.7 km || 
|-id=711 bgcolor=#d6d6d6
| 243711 ||  || — || March 2, 2000 || Catalina || CSS || — || align=right | 2.3 km || 
|-id=712 bgcolor=#fefefe
| 243712 ||  || — || March 27, 2000 || Kitt Peak || Spacewatch || FLO || align=right | 1.3 km || 
|-id=713 bgcolor=#fefefe
| 243713 ||  || — || March 29, 2000 || Kitt Peak || Spacewatch || FLO || align=right data-sort-value="0.63" | 630 m || 
|-id=714 bgcolor=#E9E9E9
| 243714 ||  || — || March 25, 2000 || Kitt Peak || Spacewatch || — || align=right | 2.6 km || 
|-id=715 bgcolor=#d6d6d6
| 243715 ||  || — || April 5, 2000 || Socorro || LINEAR || THM || align=right | 4.3 km || 
|-id=716 bgcolor=#E9E9E9
| 243716 ||  || — || April 2, 2000 || Kitt Peak || Spacewatch || — || align=right | 3.1 km || 
|-id=717 bgcolor=#fefefe
| 243717 ||  || — || April 7, 2000 || Kitt Peak || Spacewatch || — || align=right data-sort-value="0.65" | 650 m || 
|-id=718 bgcolor=#d6d6d6
| 243718 ||  || — || April 7, 2000 || Anderson Mesa || LONEOS || — || align=right | 4.3 km || 
|-id=719 bgcolor=#d6d6d6
| 243719 ||  || — || April 6, 2000 || Socorro || LINEAR || — || align=right | 2.6 km || 
|-id=720 bgcolor=#d6d6d6
| 243720 ||  || — || April 24, 2000 || Kitt Peak || Spacewatch || TRP || align=right | 3.9 km || 
|-id=721 bgcolor=#fefefe
| 243721 ||  || — || April 28, 2000 || Kitt Peak || Spacewatch || — || align=right data-sort-value="0.71" | 710 m || 
|-id=722 bgcolor=#E9E9E9
| 243722 ||  || — || April 30, 2000 || Haleakala || NEAT || — || align=right | 3.6 km || 
|-id=723 bgcolor=#fefefe
| 243723 ||  || — || April 26, 2000 || Kitt Peak || Spacewatch || — || align=right | 1.1 km || 
|-id=724 bgcolor=#fefefe
| 243724 ||  || — || May 4, 2000 || Socorro || LINEAR || H || align=right | 1.0 km || 
|-id=725 bgcolor=#fefefe
| 243725 ||  || — || May 5, 2000 || Socorro || LINEAR || FLO || align=right | 1.00 km || 
|-id=726 bgcolor=#fefefe
| 243726 ||  || — || May 3, 2000 || Socorro || LINEAR || — || align=right | 1.4 km || 
|-id=727 bgcolor=#E9E9E9
| 243727 ||  || — || May 3, 2000 || Socorro || LINEAR || TIN || align=right | 3.2 km || 
|-id=728 bgcolor=#d6d6d6
| 243728 ||  || — || May 9, 2000 || Socorro || LINEAR || — || align=right | 6.3 km || 
|-id=729 bgcolor=#fefefe
| 243729 ||  || — || May 28, 2000 || Socorro || LINEAR || — || align=right | 1.7 km || 
|-id=730 bgcolor=#fefefe
| 243730 ||  || — || May 28, 2000 || Socorro || LINEAR || FLO || align=right data-sort-value="0.84" | 840 m || 
|-id=731 bgcolor=#E9E9E9
| 243731 ||  || — || May 28, 2000 || Socorro || LINEAR || — || align=right | 3.5 km || 
|-id=732 bgcolor=#FA8072
| 243732 ||  || — || May 28, 2000 || Socorro || LINEAR || — || align=right data-sort-value="0.89" | 890 m || 
|-id=733 bgcolor=#E9E9E9
| 243733 ||  || — || June 4, 2000 || Reedy Creek || J. Broughton || CLO || align=right | 2.4 km || 
|-id=734 bgcolor=#fefefe
| 243734 ||  || — || July 5, 2000 || Anderson Mesa || LONEOS || — || align=right | 1.4 km || 
|-id=735 bgcolor=#fefefe
| 243735 ||  || — || July 23, 2000 || Eskridge || Farpoint Obs. || — || align=right | 1.4 km || 
|-id=736 bgcolor=#fefefe
| 243736 ||  || — || July 30, 2000 || Socorro || LINEAR || PHO || align=right | 1.9 km || 
|-id=737 bgcolor=#d6d6d6
| 243737 ||  || — || July 30, 2000 || Socorro || LINEAR || — || align=right | 7.5 km || 
|-id=738 bgcolor=#fefefe
| 243738 ||  || — || August 3, 2000 || Socorro || LINEAR || H || align=right data-sort-value="0.94" | 940 m || 
|-id=739 bgcolor=#fefefe
| 243739 ||  || — || August 1, 2000 || Socorro || LINEAR || NYS || align=right | 2.5 km || 
|-id=740 bgcolor=#d6d6d6
| 243740 ||  || — || August 24, 2000 || Socorro || LINEAR || TIR || align=right | 3.5 km || 
|-id=741 bgcolor=#d6d6d6
| 243741 ||  || — || August 24, 2000 || Socorro || LINEAR || URS || align=right | 5.0 km || 
|-id=742 bgcolor=#fefefe
| 243742 ||  || — || August 26, 2000 || Socorro || LINEAR || H || align=right | 1.2 km || 
|-id=743 bgcolor=#d6d6d6
| 243743 ||  || — || August 28, 2000 || Socorro || LINEAR || — || align=right | 3.2 km || 
|-id=744 bgcolor=#fefefe
| 243744 ||  || — || August 28, 2000 || Socorro || LINEAR || — || align=right | 1.4 km || 
|-id=745 bgcolor=#fefefe
| 243745 ||  || — || August 25, 2000 || Socorro || LINEAR || FLO || align=right | 1.2 km || 
|-id=746 bgcolor=#fefefe
| 243746 ||  || — || August 25, 2000 || Socorro || LINEAR || — || align=right | 2.1 km || 
|-id=747 bgcolor=#fefefe
| 243747 ||  || — || August 28, 2000 || Socorro || LINEAR || — || align=right | 2.5 km || 
|-id=748 bgcolor=#d6d6d6
| 243748 ||  || — || August 28, 2000 || Socorro || LINEAR || — || align=right | 5.7 km || 
|-id=749 bgcolor=#fefefe
| 243749 ||  || — || August 29, 2000 || Socorro || LINEAR || V || align=right data-sort-value="0.98" | 980 m || 
|-id=750 bgcolor=#fefefe
| 243750 ||  || — || August 25, 2000 || Socorro || LINEAR || — || align=right | 1.5 km || 
|-id=751 bgcolor=#fefefe
| 243751 ||  || — || August 31, 2000 || Socorro || LINEAR || H || align=right | 1.0 km || 
|-id=752 bgcolor=#d6d6d6
| 243752 ||  || — || August 31, 2000 || Socorro || LINEAR || — || align=right | 4.3 km || 
|-id=753 bgcolor=#d6d6d6
| 243753 ||  || — || August 31, 2000 || Socorro || LINEAR || — || align=right | 4.9 km || 
|-id=754 bgcolor=#fefefe
| 243754 ||  || — || August 31, 2000 || Socorro || LINEAR || — || align=right | 1.3 km || 
|-id=755 bgcolor=#d6d6d6
| 243755 ||  || — || August 31, 2000 || Socorro || LINEAR || — || align=right | 6.2 km || 
|-id=756 bgcolor=#fefefe
| 243756 ||  || — || August 29, 2000 || Socorro || LINEAR || NYS || align=right | 2.7 km || 
|-id=757 bgcolor=#d6d6d6
| 243757 ||  || — || August 29, 2000 || Socorro || LINEAR || THB || align=right | 6.0 km || 
|-id=758 bgcolor=#fefefe
| 243758 ||  || — || August 29, 2000 || Socorro || LINEAR || FLO || align=right data-sort-value="0.96" | 960 m || 
|-id=759 bgcolor=#fefefe
| 243759 ||  || — || August 31, 2000 || Socorro || LINEAR || NYS || align=right data-sort-value="0.90" | 900 m || 
|-id=760 bgcolor=#fefefe
| 243760 ||  || — || August 31, 2000 || Socorro || LINEAR || — || align=right | 1.3 km || 
|-id=761 bgcolor=#fefefe
| 243761 ||  || — || August 21, 2000 || Anderson Mesa || LONEOS || — || align=right | 1.0 km || 
|-id=762 bgcolor=#fefefe
| 243762 ||  || — || August 31, 2000 || Socorro || LINEAR || — || align=right | 2.7 km || 
|-id=763 bgcolor=#d6d6d6
| 243763 ||  || — || September 1, 2000 || Socorro || LINEAR || — || align=right | 5.8 km || 
|-id=764 bgcolor=#fefefe
| 243764 ||  || — || September 1, 2000 || Socorro || LINEAR || V || align=right data-sort-value="0.89" | 890 m || 
|-id=765 bgcolor=#fefefe
| 243765 ||  || — || September 1, 2000 || Socorro || LINEAR || — || align=right | 1.4 km || 
|-id=766 bgcolor=#fefefe
| 243766 ||  || — || September 1, 2000 || Socorro || LINEAR || — || align=right data-sort-value="0.98" | 980 m || 
|-id=767 bgcolor=#fefefe
| 243767 ||  || — || September 3, 2000 || Socorro || LINEAR || — || align=right | 3.6 km || 
|-id=768 bgcolor=#fefefe
| 243768 ||  || — || September 3, 2000 || Socorro || LINEAR || — || align=right data-sort-value="0.97" | 970 m || 
|-id=769 bgcolor=#fefefe
| 243769 ||  || — || September 8, 2000 || Kitt Peak || Spacewatch || V || align=right data-sort-value="0.71" | 710 m || 
|-id=770 bgcolor=#d6d6d6
| 243770 ||  || — || September 1, 2000 || Socorro || LINEAR || — || align=right | 4.6 km || 
|-id=771 bgcolor=#fefefe
| 243771 ||  || — || September 1, 2000 || Socorro || LINEAR || V || align=right data-sort-value="0.84" | 840 m || 
|-id=772 bgcolor=#fefefe
| 243772 ||  || — || September 3, 2000 || Socorro || LINEAR || — || align=right | 1.1 km || 
|-id=773 bgcolor=#fefefe
| 243773 ||  || — || September 3, 2000 || Socorro || LINEAR || — || align=right | 1.1 km || 
|-id=774 bgcolor=#d6d6d6
| 243774 ||  || — || September 5, 2000 || Anderson Mesa || LONEOS || — || align=right | 4.4 km || 
|-id=775 bgcolor=#FA8072
| 243775 ||  || — || September 5, 2000 || Anderson Mesa || LONEOS || PHO || align=right | 1.2 km || 
|-id=776 bgcolor=#fefefe
| 243776 || 2000 SH || — || September 18, 2000 || Ondřejov || L. Kotková || — || align=right | 2.2 km || 
|-id=777 bgcolor=#d6d6d6
| 243777 || 2000 SJ || — || September 19, 2000 || Emerald Lane || L. Ball || — || align=right | 4.5 km || 
|-id=778 bgcolor=#fefefe
| 243778 ||  || — || September 20, 2000 || Socorro || LINEAR || H || align=right | 1.2 km || 
|-id=779 bgcolor=#d6d6d6
| 243779 ||  || — || September 22, 2000 || Socorro || LINEAR || — || align=right | 5.2 km || 
|-id=780 bgcolor=#fefefe
| 243780 ||  || — || September 23, 2000 || Socorro || LINEAR || — || align=right | 2.1 km || 
|-id=781 bgcolor=#E9E9E9
| 243781 ||  || — || September 25, 2000 || Socorro || LINEAR || — || align=right | 2.8 km || 
|-id=782 bgcolor=#fefefe
| 243782 ||  || — || September 20, 2000 || Haleakala || NEAT || — || align=right | 1.1 km || 
|-id=783 bgcolor=#fefefe
| 243783 ||  || — || September 24, 2000 || Socorro || LINEAR || — || align=right data-sort-value="0.81" | 810 m || 
|-id=784 bgcolor=#fefefe
| 243784 ||  || — || September 24, 2000 || Socorro || LINEAR || V || align=right | 1.1 km || 
|-id=785 bgcolor=#fefefe
| 243785 ||  || — || September 24, 2000 || Socorro || LINEAR || V || align=right | 1.1 km || 
|-id=786 bgcolor=#E9E9E9
| 243786 ||  || — || September 24, 2000 || Socorro || LINEAR || EUN || align=right | 1.4 km || 
|-id=787 bgcolor=#fefefe
| 243787 ||  || — || September 24, 2000 || Socorro || LINEAR || ERI || align=right | 2.9 km || 
|-id=788 bgcolor=#fefefe
| 243788 ||  || — || September 24, 2000 || Socorro || LINEAR || — || align=right | 1.2 km || 
|-id=789 bgcolor=#fefefe
| 243789 ||  || — || September 24, 2000 || Socorro || LINEAR || — || align=right | 2.6 km || 
|-id=790 bgcolor=#fefefe
| 243790 ||  || — || September 24, 2000 || Socorro || LINEAR || MAS || align=right | 1.2 km || 
|-id=791 bgcolor=#fefefe
| 243791 ||  || — || September 24, 2000 || Socorro || LINEAR || — || align=right | 1.2 km || 
|-id=792 bgcolor=#fefefe
| 243792 ||  || — || September 24, 2000 || Socorro || LINEAR || — || align=right | 1.3 km || 
|-id=793 bgcolor=#fefefe
| 243793 ||  || — || September 24, 2000 || Socorro || LINEAR || — || align=right | 1.5 km || 
|-id=794 bgcolor=#fefefe
| 243794 ||  || — || September 23, 2000 || Socorro || LINEAR || — || align=right | 1.0 km || 
|-id=795 bgcolor=#fefefe
| 243795 ||  || — || September 24, 2000 || Socorro || LINEAR || — || align=right | 1.5 km || 
|-id=796 bgcolor=#fefefe
| 243796 ||  || — || September 24, 2000 || Socorro || LINEAR || — || align=right | 1.4 km || 
|-id=797 bgcolor=#fefefe
| 243797 ||  || — || September 24, 2000 || Socorro || LINEAR || MAS || align=right data-sort-value="0.98" | 980 m || 
|-id=798 bgcolor=#d6d6d6
| 243798 ||  || — || September 22, 2000 || Socorro || LINEAR || — || align=right | 3.6 km || 
|-id=799 bgcolor=#d6d6d6
| 243799 ||  || — || September 23, 2000 || Socorro || LINEAR || EUP || align=right | 5.8 km || 
|-id=800 bgcolor=#d6d6d6
| 243800 ||  || — || September 23, 2000 || Socorro || LINEAR || — || align=right | 4.4 km || 
|}

243801–243900 

|-bgcolor=#d6d6d6
| 243801 ||  || — || September 23, 2000 || Socorro || LINEAR || — || align=right | 5.1 km || 
|-id=802 bgcolor=#fefefe
| 243802 ||  || — || September 23, 2000 || Socorro || LINEAR || V || align=right | 1.1 km || 
|-id=803 bgcolor=#fefefe
| 243803 ||  || — || September 26, 2000 || Socorro || LINEAR || NYS || align=right data-sort-value="0.84" | 840 m || 
|-id=804 bgcolor=#d6d6d6
| 243804 ||  || — || September 23, 2000 || Kitt Peak || Spacewatch || — || align=right | 3.6 km || 
|-id=805 bgcolor=#fefefe
| 243805 ||  || — || September 28, 2000 || Kitt Peak || Spacewatch || — || align=right | 1.0 km || 
|-id=806 bgcolor=#d6d6d6
| 243806 ||  || — || September 21, 2000 || Haleakala || NEAT || — || align=right | 3.0 km || 
|-id=807 bgcolor=#fefefe
| 243807 ||  || — || September 28, 2000 || Socorro || LINEAR || — || align=right | 1.4 km || 
|-id=808 bgcolor=#fefefe
| 243808 ||  || — || September 24, 2000 || Socorro || LINEAR || FLO || align=right data-sort-value="0.85" | 850 m || 
|-id=809 bgcolor=#E9E9E9
| 243809 ||  || — || September 27, 2000 || Socorro || LINEAR || — || align=right | 2.0 km || 
|-id=810 bgcolor=#fefefe
| 243810 ||  || — || September 21, 2000 || Socorro || LINEAR || — || align=right | 1.1 km || 
|-id=811 bgcolor=#d6d6d6
| 243811 ||  || — || September 25, 2000 || Socorro || LINEAR || Tj (2.99) || align=right | 5.8 km || 
|-id=812 bgcolor=#d6d6d6
| 243812 ||  || — || September 24, 2000 || Socorro || LINEAR || EUP || align=right | 6.2 km || 
|-id=813 bgcolor=#fefefe
| 243813 ||  || — || September 30, 2000 || Socorro || LINEAR || V || align=right | 1.2 km || 
|-id=814 bgcolor=#E9E9E9
| 243814 ||  || — || September 27, 2000 || Socorro || LINEAR || — || align=right | 2.6 km || 
|-id=815 bgcolor=#d6d6d6
| 243815 ||  || — || September 28, 2000 || Socorro || LINEAR || — || align=right | 3.7 km || 
|-id=816 bgcolor=#fefefe
| 243816 ||  || — || September 28, 2000 || Socorro || LINEAR || — || align=right | 1.4 km || 
|-id=817 bgcolor=#fefefe
| 243817 ||  || — || September 30, 2000 || Socorro || LINEAR || — || align=right | 1.5 km || 
|-id=818 bgcolor=#fefefe
| 243818 ||  || — || September 28, 2000 || Socorro || LINEAR || — || align=right | 2.4 km || 
|-id=819 bgcolor=#fefefe
| 243819 ||  || — || September 26, 2000 || Kitt Peak || Spacewatch || KLI || align=right | 2.5 km || 
|-id=820 bgcolor=#fefefe
| 243820 ||  || — || September 23, 2000 || Socorro || LINEAR || V || align=right | 1.2 km || 
|-id=821 bgcolor=#d6d6d6
| 243821 ||  || — || September 22, 2000 || Kitt Peak || Spacewatch || — || align=right | 6.1 km || 
|-id=822 bgcolor=#E9E9E9
| 243822 ||  || — || September 28, 2000 || Anderson Mesa || LONEOS || — || align=right | 1.5 km || 
|-id=823 bgcolor=#fefefe
| 243823 ||  || — || September 25, 2000 || Socorro || LINEAR || — || align=right | 1.0 km || 
|-id=824 bgcolor=#d6d6d6
| 243824 ||  || — || October 1, 2000 || Socorro || LINEAR || — || align=right | 5.0 km || 
|-id=825 bgcolor=#fefefe
| 243825 ||  || — || October 1, 2000 || Socorro || LINEAR || — || align=right data-sort-value="0.92" | 920 m || 
|-id=826 bgcolor=#fefefe
| 243826 ||  || — || October 1, 2000 || Socorro || LINEAR || — || align=right | 2.9 km || 
|-id=827 bgcolor=#fefefe
| 243827 ||  || — || October 2, 2000 || Socorro || LINEAR || — || align=right | 1.4 km || 
|-id=828 bgcolor=#d6d6d6
| 243828 ||  || — || October 2, 2000 || Socorro || LINEAR || EOS || align=right | 3.1 km || 
|-id=829 bgcolor=#fefefe
| 243829 ||  || — || October 6, 2000 || Kitt Peak || Spacewatch || MAS || align=right data-sort-value="0.78" | 780 m || 
|-id=830 bgcolor=#fefefe
| 243830 ||  || — || October 6, 2000 || Anderson Mesa || LONEOS || — || align=right | 1.9 km || 
|-id=831 bgcolor=#fefefe
| 243831 ||  || — || October 1, 2000 || Socorro || LINEAR || V || align=right data-sort-value="0.95" | 950 m || 
|-id=832 bgcolor=#fefefe
| 243832 ||  || — || October 2, 2000 || Anderson Mesa || LONEOS || — || align=right | 1.4 km || 
|-id=833 bgcolor=#fefefe
| 243833 ||  || — || October 31, 2000 || Socorro || LINEAR || H || align=right data-sort-value="0.89" | 890 m || 
|-id=834 bgcolor=#fefefe
| 243834 ||  || — || October 24, 2000 || Socorro || LINEAR || — || align=right | 1.3 km || 
|-id=835 bgcolor=#E9E9E9
| 243835 ||  || — || October 25, 2000 || Socorro || LINEAR || MIT || align=right | 3.6 km || 
|-id=836 bgcolor=#d6d6d6
| 243836 ||  || — || October 25, 2000 || Socorro || LINEAR || — || align=right | 4.7 km || 
|-id=837 bgcolor=#fefefe
| 243837 ||  || — || October 29, 2000 || Socorro || LINEAR || V || align=right data-sort-value="0.99" | 990 m || 
|-id=838 bgcolor=#fefefe
| 243838 ||  || — || October 24, 2000 || Socorro || LINEAR || V || align=right data-sort-value="0.96" | 960 m || 
|-id=839 bgcolor=#d6d6d6
| 243839 ||  || — || October 25, 2000 || Socorro || LINEAR || — || align=right | 5.2 km || 
|-id=840 bgcolor=#fefefe
| 243840 ||  || — || October 30, 2000 || Socorro || LINEAR || — || align=right | 1.3 km || 
|-id=841 bgcolor=#fefefe
| 243841 ||  || — || November 1, 2000 || Socorro || LINEAR || — || align=right | 1.6 km || 
|-id=842 bgcolor=#d6d6d6
| 243842 ||  || — || November 1, 2000 || Socorro || LINEAR || — || align=right | 6.0 km || 
|-id=843 bgcolor=#fefefe
| 243843 ||  || — || November 1, 2000 || Socorro || LINEAR || PHO || align=right | 1.7 km || 
|-id=844 bgcolor=#E9E9E9
| 243844 ||  || — || November 1, 2000 || Socorro || LINEAR || NEM || align=right | 2.7 km || 
|-id=845 bgcolor=#E9E9E9
| 243845 ||  || — || November 2, 2000 || Socorro || LINEAR || — || align=right | 2.1 km || 
|-id=846 bgcolor=#fefefe
| 243846 ||  || — || November 9, 2000 || Socorro || LINEAR || PHO || align=right | 1.8 km || 
|-id=847 bgcolor=#fefefe
| 243847 ||  || — || November 9, 2000 || Socorro || LINEAR || — || align=right | 2.0 km || 
|-id=848 bgcolor=#E9E9E9
| 243848 ||  || — || November 16, 2000 || Socorro || LINEAR || — || align=right | 4.1 km || 
|-id=849 bgcolor=#d6d6d6
| 243849 ||  || — || November 20, 2000 || Socorro || LINEAR || — || align=right | 4.3 km || 
|-id=850 bgcolor=#fefefe
| 243850 ||  || — || November 21, 2000 || Socorro || LINEAR || — || align=right | 1.3 km || 
|-id=851 bgcolor=#fefefe
| 243851 ||  || — || November 20, 2000 || Socorro || LINEAR || — || align=right | 1.3 km || 
|-id=852 bgcolor=#fefefe
| 243852 ||  || — || November 20, 2000 || Socorro || LINEAR || V || align=right | 1.4 km || 
|-id=853 bgcolor=#fefefe
| 243853 ||  || — || November 27, 2000 || Kitt Peak || Spacewatch || — || align=right | 1.2 km || 
|-id=854 bgcolor=#d6d6d6
| 243854 ||  || — || November 19, 2000 || Socorro || LINEAR || — || align=right | 3.3 km || 
|-id=855 bgcolor=#d6d6d6
| 243855 ||  || — || November 20, 2000 || Socorro || LINEAR || — || align=right | 6.5 km || 
|-id=856 bgcolor=#d6d6d6
| 243856 ||  || — || November 20, 2000 || Socorro || LINEAR || — || align=right | 5.5 km || 
|-id=857 bgcolor=#d6d6d6
| 243857 ||  || — || November 26, 2000 || Socorro || LINEAR || — || align=right | 4.8 km || 
|-id=858 bgcolor=#E9E9E9
| 243858 ||  || — || November 23, 2000 || Kitt Peak || Spacewatch || MAR || align=right | 1.7 km || 
|-id=859 bgcolor=#E9E9E9
| 243859 ||  || — || November 19, 2000 || Kitt Peak || Spacewatch || — || align=right | 3.8 km || 
|-id=860 bgcolor=#fefefe
| 243860 ||  || — || November 20, 2000 || Anderson Mesa || LONEOS || — || align=right | 2.9 km || 
|-id=861 bgcolor=#E9E9E9
| 243861 ||  || — || November 20, 2000 || Anderson Mesa || LONEOS || — || align=right | 1.4 km || 
|-id=862 bgcolor=#fefefe
| 243862 ||  || — || November 21, 2000 || Socorro || LINEAR || H || align=right | 1.1 km || 
|-id=863 bgcolor=#d6d6d6
| 243863 ||  || — || November 30, 2000 || Socorro || LINEAR || URS || align=right | 6.1 km || 
|-id=864 bgcolor=#fefefe
| 243864 ||  || — || November 21, 2000 || Socorro || LINEAR || MAS || align=right data-sort-value="0.89" | 890 m || 
|-id=865 bgcolor=#E9E9E9
| 243865 ||  || — || November 25, 2000 || Anderson Mesa || LONEOS || — || align=right | 2.8 km || 
|-id=866 bgcolor=#d6d6d6
| 243866 ||  || — || November 30, 2000 || Anderson Mesa || LONEOS || EOS || align=right | 3.7 km || 
|-id=867 bgcolor=#d6d6d6
| 243867 ||  || — || November 18, 2000 || Anderson Mesa || LONEOS || — || align=right | 4.5 km || 
|-id=868 bgcolor=#E9E9E9
| 243868 ||  || — || November 18, 2000 || Anderson Mesa || LONEOS || — || align=right | 1.4 km || 
|-id=869 bgcolor=#E9E9E9
| 243869 ||  || — || December 3, 2000 || Kitt Peak || Spacewatch || — || align=right | 3.2 km || 
|-id=870 bgcolor=#E9E9E9
| 243870 ||  || — || December 3, 2000 || Kitt Peak || Spacewatch || — || align=right | 2.2 km || 
|-id=871 bgcolor=#d6d6d6
| 243871 ||  || — || December 1, 2000 || Socorro || LINEAR || — || align=right | 6.6 km || 
|-id=872 bgcolor=#E9E9E9
| 243872 ||  || — || December 4, 2000 || Socorro || LINEAR || — || align=right | 2.1 km || 
|-id=873 bgcolor=#E9E9E9
| 243873 ||  || — || December 4, 2000 || Socorro || LINEAR || — || align=right | 2.0 km || 
|-id=874 bgcolor=#fefefe
| 243874 ||  || — || December 4, 2000 || Socorro || LINEAR || — || align=right | 3.2 km || 
|-id=875 bgcolor=#d6d6d6
| 243875 ||  || — || December 5, 2000 || Socorro || LINEAR || — || align=right | 6.6 km || 
|-id=876 bgcolor=#E9E9E9
| 243876 ||  || — || December 5, 2000 || Socorro || LINEAR || — || align=right | 2.6 km || 
|-id=877 bgcolor=#E9E9E9
| 243877 ||  || — || December 17, 2000 || Socorro || LINEAR || — || align=right | 2.0 km || 
|-id=878 bgcolor=#E9E9E9
| 243878 ||  || — || December 20, 2000 || Socorro || LINEAR || — || align=right | 1.8 km || 
|-id=879 bgcolor=#fefefe
| 243879 ||  || — || December 21, 2000 || Socorro || LINEAR || — || align=right | 1.1 km || 
|-id=880 bgcolor=#E9E9E9
| 243880 ||  || — || December 28, 2000 || Kitt Peak || Spacewatch || — || align=right | 3.1 km || 
|-id=881 bgcolor=#FA8072
| 243881 ||  || — || December 31, 2000 || Haleakala || NEAT || H || align=right | 1.9 km || 
|-id=882 bgcolor=#fefefe
| 243882 ||  || — || December 30, 2000 || Socorro || LINEAR || — || align=right | 3.2 km || 
|-id=883 bgcolor=#E9E9E9
| 243883 ||  || — || December 30, 2000 || Socorro || LINEAR || — || align=right | 1.8 km || 
|-id=884 bgcolor=#E9E9E9
| 243884 ||  || — || December 30, 2000 || Socorro || LINEAR || — || align=right | 1.7 km || 
|-id=885 bgcolor=#fefefe
| 243885 ||  || — || December 30, 2000 || Socorro || LINEAR || NYS || align=right | 2.1 km || 
|-id=886 bgcolor=#d6d6d6
| 243886 ||  || — || December 30, 2000 || Socorro || LINEAR || THB || align=right | 7.2 km || 
|-id=887 bgcolor=#E9E9E9
| 243887 ||  || — || December 31, 2000 || Haleakala || NEAT || — || align=right | 1.9 km || 
|-id=888 bgcolor=#fefefe
| 243888 ||  || — || December 17, 2000 || Kitt Peak || Spacewatch || NYS || align=right | 1.1 km || 
|-id=889 bgcolor=#E9E9E9
| 243889 ||  || — || January 2, 2001 || Socorro || LINEAR || — || align=right | 2.2 km || 
|-id=890 bgcolor=#E9E9E9
| 243890 ||  || — || January 5, 2001 || Socorro || LINEAR || — || align=right | 2.2 km || 
|-id=891 bgcolor=#E9E9E9
| 243891 ||  || — || January 15, 2001 || Socorro || LINEAR || EUN || align=right | 1.8 km || 
|-id=892 bgcolor=#E9E9E9
| 243892 ||  || — || January 14, 2001 || Kitt Peak || Spacewatch || — || align=right | 1.9 km || 
|-id=893 bgcolor=#E9E9E9
| 243893 ||  || — || January 19, 2001 || Socorro || LINEAR || BAR || align=right | 1.7 km || 
|-id=894 bgcolor=#E9E9E9
| 243894 ||  || — || January 20, 2001 || Socorro || LINEAR || — || align=right | 1.4 km || 
|-id=895 bgcolor=#d6d6d6
| 243895 ||  || — || January 20, 2001 || Socorro || LINEAR || — || align=right | 4.2 km || 
|-id=896 bgcolor=#E9E9E9
| 243896 ||  || — || January 21, 2001 || Socorro || LINEAR || — || align=right | 3.9 km || 
|-id=897 bgcolor=#d6d6d6
| 243897 ||  || — || January 17, 2001 || Kitt Peak || Spacewatch || URS || align=right | 5.2 km || 
|-id=898 bgcolor=#fefefe
| 243898 ||  || — || January 19, 2001 || Socorro || LINEAR || ERI || align=right | 2.8 km || 
|-id=899 bgcolor=#d6d6d6
| 243899 ||  || — || February 17, 2001 || Socorro || LINEAR || HYG || align=right | 5.2 km || 
|-id=900 bgcolor=#E9E9E9
| 243900 ||  || — || February 19, 2001 || Socorro || LINEAR || — || align=right | 1.8 km || 
|}

243901–244000 

|-bgcolor=#E9E9E9
| 243901 ||  || — || March 1, 2001 || Socorro || LINEAR || — || align=right | 3.1 km || 
|-id=902 bgcolor=#d6d6d6
| 243902 ||  || — || March 2, 2001 || Anderson Mesa || LONEOS || — || align=right | 6.4 km || 
|-id=903 bgcolor=#fefefe
| 243903 ||  || — || March 15, 2001 || Socorro || LINEAR || H || align=right | 1.1 km || 
|-id=904 bgcolor=#E9E9E9
| 243904 ||  || — || March 18, 2001 || Socorro || LINEAR || — || align=right | 2.3 km || 
|-id=905 bgcolor=#E9E9E9
| 243905 ||  || — || March 23, 2001 || Socorro || LINEAR || ADE || align=right | 4.3 km || 
|-id=906 bgcolor=#E9E9E9
| 243906 ||  || — || March 24, 2001 || Kitt Peak || Spacewatch || — || align=right | 2.9 km || 
|-id=907 bgcolor=#E9E9E9
| 243907 ||  || — || March 16, 2001 || Socorro || LINEAR || — || align=right | 2.0 km || 
|-id=908 bgcolor=#E9E9E9
| 243908 ||  || — || March 16, 2001 || Socorro || LINEAR || — || align=right | 2.4 km || 
|-id=909 bgcolor=#E9E9E9
| 243909 ||  || — || March 18, 2001 || Socorro || LINEAR || JUN || align=right | 1.1 km || 
|-id=910 bgcolor=#d6d6d6
| 243910 ||  || — || March 23, 2001 || Anderson Mesa || LONEOS || — || align=right | 2.3 km || 
|-id=911 bgcolor=#E9E9E9
| 243911 ||  || — || March 16, 2001 || Socorro || LINEAR || — || align=right | 2.9 km || 
|-id=912 bgcolor=#E9E9E9
| 243912 ||  || — || April 17, 2001 || Socorro || LINEAR || — || align=right | 3.0 km || 
|-id=913 bgcolor=#E9E9E9
| 243913 ||  || — || April 21, 2001 || Socorro || LINEAR || — || align=right | 3.4 km || 
|-id=914 bgcolor=#d6d6d6
| 243914 ||  || — || April 26, 2001 || Desert Beaver || W. K. Y. Yeung || — || align=right | 7.7 km || 
|-id=915 bgcolor=#d6d6d6
| 243915 ||  || — || April 25, 2001 || Anderson Mesa || LONEOS || Tj (2.98) || align=right | 8.0 km || 
|-id=916 bgcolor=#E9E9E9
| 243916 ||  || — || April 16, 2001 || Kitt Peak || Spacewatch || ADE || align=right | 3.3 km || 
|-id=917 bgcolor=#E9E9E9
| 243917 ||  || — || May 24, 2001 || Kitt Peak || Spacewatch || — || align=right | 2.6 km || 
|-id=918 bgcolor=#E9E9E9
| 243918 ||  || — || May 24, 2001 || Socorro || LINEAR || — || align=right | 3.6 km || 
|-id=919 bgcolor=#E9E9E9
| 243919 ||  || — || May 23, 2001 || Socorro || LINEAR || — || align=right | 3.4 km || 
|-id=920 bgcolor=#E9E9E9
| 243920 ||  || — || June 27, 2001 || Palomar || NEAT || — || align=right | 3.5 km || 
|-id=921 bgcolor=#E9E9E9
| 243921 ||  || — || June 16, 2001 || Anderson Mesa || LONEOS || CLO || align=right | 3.1 km || 
|-id=922 bgcolor=#E9E9E9
| 243922 ||  || — || June 19, 2001 || Palomar || NEAT || — || align=right | 3.8 km || 
|-id=923 bgcolor=#E9E9E9
| 243923 ||  || — || July 10, 2001 || Palomar || NEAT || — || align=right | 7.3 km || 
|-id=924 bgcolor=#E9E9E9
| 243924 ||  || — || July 1, 2001 || Palomar || NEAT || — || align=right | 1.5 km || 
|-id=925 bgcolor=#E9E9E9
| 243925 ||  || — || July 17, 2001 || Anderson Mesa || LONEOS || — || align=right | 4.8 km || 
|-id=926 bgcolor=#d6d6d6
| 243926 ||  || — || July 18, 2001 || Palomar || NEAT || EUP || align=right | 9.1 km || 
|-id=927 bgcolor=#FA8072
| 243927 ||  || — || July 19, 2001 || Palomar || NEAT || — || align=right data-sort-value="0.97" | 970 m || 
|-id=928 bgcolor=#E9E9E9
| 243928 ||  || — || July 21, 2001 || Palomar || NEAT || — || align=right | 1.6 km || 
|-id=929 bgcolor=#E9E9E9
| 243929 ||  || — || July 21, 2001 || Haleakala || NEAT || — || align=right | 3.2 km || 
|-id=930 bgcolor=#d6d6d6
| 243930 ||  || — || July 23, 2001 || Palomar || NEAT || EUP || align=right | 8.0 km || 
|-id=931 bgcolor=#E9E9E9
| 243931 ||  || — || July 22, 2001 || Socorro || LINEAR || — || align=right | 1.2 km || 
|-id=932 bgcolor=#E9E9E9
| 243932 ||  || — || July 21, 2001 || Haleakala || NEAT || — || align=right | 3.2 km || 
|-id=933 bgcolor=#d6d6d6
| 243933 ||  || — || July 31, 2001 || Palomar || NEAT || — || align=right | 2.6 km || 
|-id=934 bgcolor=#E9E9E9
| 243934 ||  || — || July 29, 2001 || Socorro || LINEAR || — || align=right | 2.4 km || 
|-id=935 bgcolor=#fefefe
| 243935 ||  || — || August 10, 2001 || Haleakala || NEAT || — || align=right | 1.5 km || 
|-id=936 bgcolor=#E9E9E9
| 243936 ||  || — || August 13, 2001 || Kvistaberg || UDAS || DOR || align=right | 3.6 km || 
|-id=937 bgcolor=#E9E9E9
| 243937 ||  || — || August 10, 2001 || Haleakala || NEAT || — || align=right | 1.7 km || 
|-id=938 bgcolor=#fefefe
| 243938 ||  || — || August 11, 2001 || Haleakala || NEAT || — || align=right | 1.2 km || 
|-id=939 bgcolor=#fefefe
| 243939 ||  || — || August 10, 2001 || Palomar || NEAT || — || align=right | 2.5 km || 
|-id=940 bgcolor=#E9E9E9
| 243940 ||  || — || August 10, 2001 || Palomar || NEAT || DOR || align=right | 3.5 km || 
|-id=941 bgcolor=#E9E9E9
| 243941 ||  || — || August 11, 2001 || Palomar || NEAT || TIN || align=right | 2.2 km || 
|-id=942 bgcolor=#E9E9E9
| 243942 ||  || — || August 13, 2001 || Palomar || NEAT || TIN || align=right | 2.7 km || 
|-id=943 bgcolor=#E9E9E9
| 243943 ||  || — || August 14, 2001 || Palomar || NEAT || — || align=right | 3.7 km || 
|-id=944 bgcolor=#fefefe
| 243944 ||  || — || August 16, 2001 || Socorro || LINEAR || — || align=right | 3.1 km || 
|-id=945 bgcolor=#E9E9E9
| 243945 ||  || — || August 16, 2001 || Socorro || LINEAR || PAE || align=right | 3.2 km || 
|-id=946 bgcolor=#E9E9E9
| 243946 ||  || — || August 16, 2001 || Socorro || LINEAR || TIN || align=right | 4.1 km || 
|-id=947 bgcolor=#d6d6d6
| 243947 ||  || — || August 16, 2001 || Palomar || NEAT || — || align=right | 5.2 km || 
|-id=948 bgcolor=#E9E9E9
| 243948 ||  || — || August 17, 2001 || Socorro || LINEAR || — || align=right | 2.8 km || 
|-id=949 bgcolor=#E9E9E9
| 243949 ||  || — || August 20, 2001 || Socorro || LINEAR || ADE || align=right | 5.2 km || 
|-id=950 bgcolor=#fefefe
| 243950 ||  || — || August 20, 2001 || Socorro || LINEAR || — || align=right | 1.5 km || 
|-id=951 bgcolor=#d6d6d6
| 243951 ||  || — || August 31, 2001 || Desert Eagle || W. K. Y. Yeung || — || align=right | 4.0 km || 
|-id=952 bgcolor=#E9E9E9
| 243952 ||  || — || August 24, 2001 || Haleakala || NEAT || ADE || align=right | 3.9 km || 
|-id=953 bgcolor=#E9E9E9
| 243953 ||  || — || August 25, 2001 || Socorro || LINEAR || — || align=right | 3.8 km || 
|-id=954 bgcolor=#d6d6d6
| 243954 ||  || — || August 25, 2001 || Socorro || LINEAR || EOS || align=right | 2.7 km || 
|-id=955 bgcolor=#E9E9E9
| 243955 ||  || — || August 25, 2001 || Palomar || NEAT || — || align=right | 3.4 km || 
|-id=956 bgcolor=#E9E9E9
| 243956 ||  || — || August 22, 2001 || Socorro || LINEAR || — || align=right | 3.7 km || 
|-id=957 bgcolor=#E9E9E9
| 243957 ||  || — || August 23, 2001 || Anderson Mesa || LONEOS || — || align=right | 2.7 km || 
|-id=958 bgcolor=#fefefe
| 243958 ||  || — || August 23, 2001 || Anderson Mesa || LONEOS || NYS || align=right data-sort-value="0.68" | 680 m || 
|-id=959 bgcolor=#E9E9E9
| 243959 ||  || — || August 23, 2001 || Anderson Mesa || LONEOS || — || align=right | 3.0 km || 
|-id=960 bgcolor=#d6d6d6
| 243960 ||  || — || August 24, 2001 || Anderson Mesa || LONEOS || — || align=right | 5.4 km || 
|-id=961 bgcolor=#E9E9E9
| 243961 ||  || — || August 24, 2001 || Anderson Mesa || LONEOS || DOR || align=right | 2.9 km || 
|-id=962 bgcolor=#E9E9E9
| 243962 ||  || — || August 24, 2001 || Socorro || LINEAR || — || align=right | 1.8 km || 
|-id=963 bgcolor=#fefefe
| 243963 ||  || — || August 24, 2001 || Socorro || LINEAR || — || align=right | 1.5 km || 
|-id=964 bgcolor=#E9E9E9
| 243964 ||  || — || August 25, 2001 || Anderson Mesa || LONEOS || — || align=right | 4.1 km || 
|-id=965 bgcolor=#d6d6d6
| 243965 ||  || — || August 26, 2001 || Anderson Mesa || LONEOS || — || align=right | 6.6 km || 
|-id=966 bgcolor=#fefefe
| 243966 ||  || — || August 19, 2001 || Socorro || LINEAR || — || align=right | 1.1 km || 
|-id=967 bgcolor=#d6d6d6
| 243967 ||  || — || August 17, 2001 || Palomar || NEAT || — || align=right | 4.2 km || 
|-id=968 bgcolor=#d6d6d6
| 243968 ||  || — || August 24, 2001 || Anderson Mesa || LONEOS || — || align=right | 2.8 km || 
|-id=969 bgcolor=#fefefe
| 243969 ||  || — || August 24, 2001 || Socorro || LINEAR || FLO || align=right data-sort-value="0.93" | 930 m || 
|-id=970 bgcolor=#fefefe
| 243970 ||  || — || August 22, 2001 || Kitt Peak || Spacewatch || V || align=right data-sort-value="0.90" | 900 m || 
|-id=971 bgcolor=#d6d6d6
| 243971 ||  || — || August 25, 2001 || Socorro || LINEAR || EOS || align=right | 5.2 km || 
|-id=972 bgcolor=#d6d6d6
| 243972 ||  || — || August 27, 2001 || Palomar || NEAT || — || align=right | 4.4 km || 
|-id=973 bgcolor=#d6d6d6
| 243973 ||  || — || September 7, 2001 || Socorro || LINEAR || EUP || align=right | 8.1 km || 
|-id=974 bgcolor=#E9E9E9
| 243974 ||  || — || September 10, 2001 || Socorro || LINEAR || PAL || align=right | 3.6 km || 
|-id=975 bgcolor=#fefefe
| 243975 ||  || — || September 7, 2001 || Socorro || LINEAR || — || align=right data-sort-value="0.93" | 930 m || 
|-id=976 bgcolor=#d6d6d6
| 243976 ||  || — || September 7, 2001 || Socorro || LINEAR || EOS || align=right | 3.0 km || 
|-id=977 bgcolor=#fefefe
| 243977 ||  || — || September 8, 2001 || Socorro || LINEAR || — || align=right | 1.0 km || 
|-id=978 bgcolor=#d6d6d6
| 243978 ||  || — || September 10, 2001 || Socorro || LINEAR || EOS || align=right | 2.3 km || 
|-id=979 bgcolor=#E9E9E9
| 243979 ||  || — || September 9, 2001 || Palomar || NEAT || ADE || align=right | 2.9 km || 
|-id=980 bgcolor=#d6d6d6
| 243980 ||  || — || September 11, 2001 || Socorro || LINEAR || EUP || align=right | 6.8 km || 
|-id=981 bgcolor=#fefefe
| 243981 ||  || — || September 10, 2001 || Socorro || LINEAR || — || align=right | 1.2 km || 
|-id=982 bgcolor=#E9E9E9
| 243982 ||  || — || September 12, 2001 || Socorro || LINEAR || — || align=right | 3.2 km || 
|-id=983 bgcolor=#E9E9E9
| 243983 ||  || — || September 12, 2001 || Socorro || LINEAR || DOR || align=right | 3.2 km || 
|-id=984 bgcolor=#d6d6d6
| 243984 ||  || — || September 12, 2001 || Socorro || LINEAR || — || align=right | 4.1 km || 
|-id=985 bgcolor=#d6d6d6
| 243985 ||  || — || September 12, 2001 || Socorro || LINEAR || TEL || align=right | 2.0 km || 
|-id=986 bgcolor=#fefefe
| 243986 ||  || — || September 12, 2001 || Socorro || LINEAR || NYS || align=right data-sort-value="0.96" | 960 m || 
|-id=987 bgcolor=#E9E9E9
| 243987 ||  || — || September 10, 2001 || Socorro || LINEAR || — || align=right | 3.8 km || 
|-id=988 bgcolor=#fefefe
| 243988 ||  || — || September 10, 2001 || Socorro || LINEAR || — || align=right | 1.4 km || 
|-id=989 bgcolor=#d6d6d6
| 243989 ||  || — || September 12, 2001 || Socorro || LINEAR || TEL || align=right | 2.1 km || 
|-id=990 bgcolor=#d6d6d6
| 243990 ||  || — || September 12, 2001 || Socorro || LINEAR || NAE || align=right | 5.0 km || 
|-id=991 bgcolor=#E9E9E9
| 243991 ||  || — || September 12, 2001 || Socorro || LINEAR || — || align=right | 2.5 km || 
|-id=992 bgcolor=#fefefe
| 243992 ||  || — || September 12, 2001 || Socorro || LINEAR || — || align=right data-sort-value="0.93" | 930 m || 
|-id=993 bgcolor=#d6d6d6
| 243993 ||  || — || September 12, 2001 || Socorro || LINEAR || — || align=right | 3.2 km || 
|-id=994 bgcolor=#fefefe
| 243994 ||  || — || September 12, 2001 || Socorro || LINEAR || NYS || align=right data-sort-value="0.96" | 960 m || 
|-id=995 bgcolor=#E9E9E9
| 243995 ||  || — || September 13, 2001 || Palomar || NEAT || — || align=right | 2.8 km || 
|-id=996 bgcolor=#fefefe
| 243996 ||  || — || September 11, 2001 || Anderson Mesa || LONEOS || — || align=right data-sort-value="0.83" | 830 m || 
|-id=997 bgcolor=#fefefe
| 243997 ||  || — || September 18, 2001 || Kitt Peak || Spacewatch || — || align=right data-sort-value="0.98" | 980 m || 
|-id=998 bgcolor=#d6d6d6
| 243998 ||  || — || September 16, 2001 || Socorro || LINEAR || EOS || align=right | 2.5 km || 
|-id=999 bgcolor=#E9E9E9
| 243999 ||  || — || September 16, 2001 || Socorro || LINEAR || XIZ || align=right | 1.9 km || 
|-id=000 bgcolor=#fefefe
| 244000 ||  || — || September 16, 2001 || Socorro || LINEAR || V || align=right data-sort-value="0.99" | 990 m || 
|}

References

External links 
 Discovery Circumstances: Numbered Minor Planets (240001)–(245000) (IAU Minor Planet Center)

0243